= List of alumni of Aix-Marseille University =

This is a list of notable graduates as well as non-graduate former students of Aix-Marseille University (AMU), based in Provence, southern France. Founded in 1409, the institution underwent reform in 2012 following the reunification of the University of Provence, the University of the Mediterranean, and Paul Cézanne University, leading to the establishment of the largest university in the French-speaking world.

The list also includes those who may be considered alumni by extension, having studied at institutions that previously were part, or later became part of the university. The list has been divided into categories indicating the field of activity in which alumni have become well known. Many of AMU’s alumni have distinguished themselves in more than one field; however, these appear only in the category which they are most often associated. This page does not include individuals whose only connection with AMU consists in the award of an honorary degree.

== Nobel laureates ==
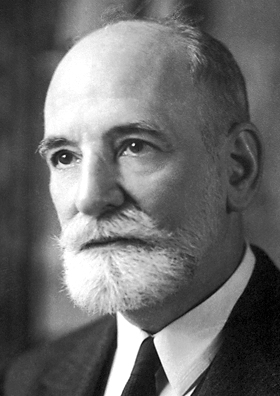
René Cassin, winner of the 1968 Nobel Peace Prize

- Pierre Agostini – winner of the 2023 Nobel Prize in Physics
- René Cassin – winner of the 1968 Nobel Peace Prize
- J. M. G. Le Clézio – winner of the 2008 Nobel Prize in Literature
- Frédéric Mistral – winner of the 1904 Nobel Prize in Literature

== Politicians and civil servants ==
=== Heads/deputy heads of state and government ===
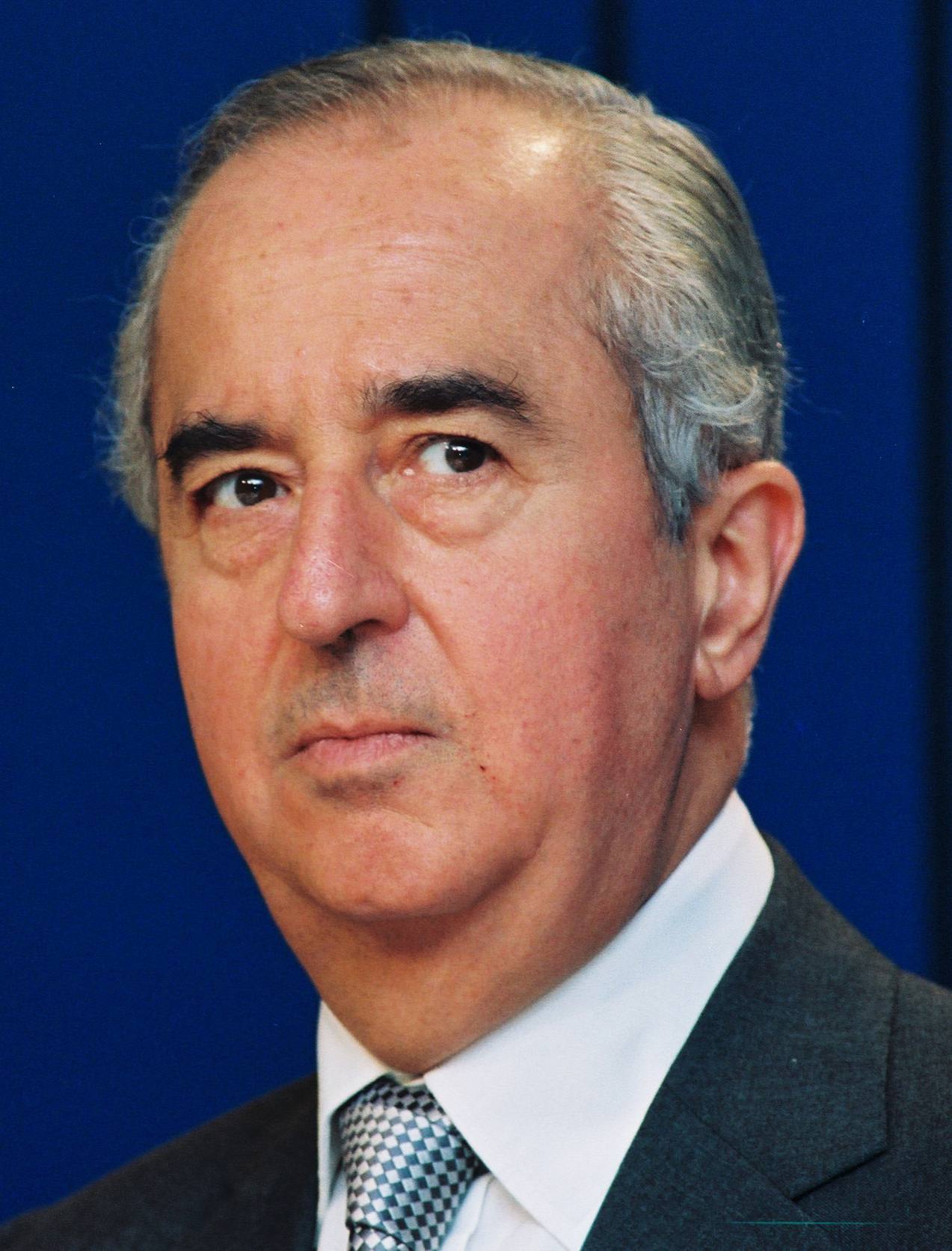
Édouard Balladur, Prime Minister of France from 1993 to 1995

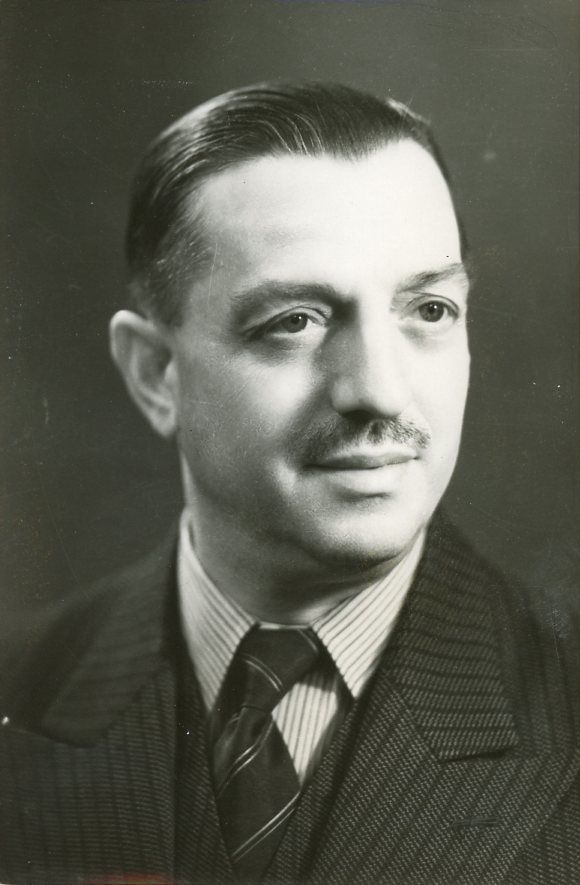
Félix Gouin, President of the Provisional Government and Prime Minister of France from Jan to Jun 1946, and President of the National Assembly of France from 1943 to 1946

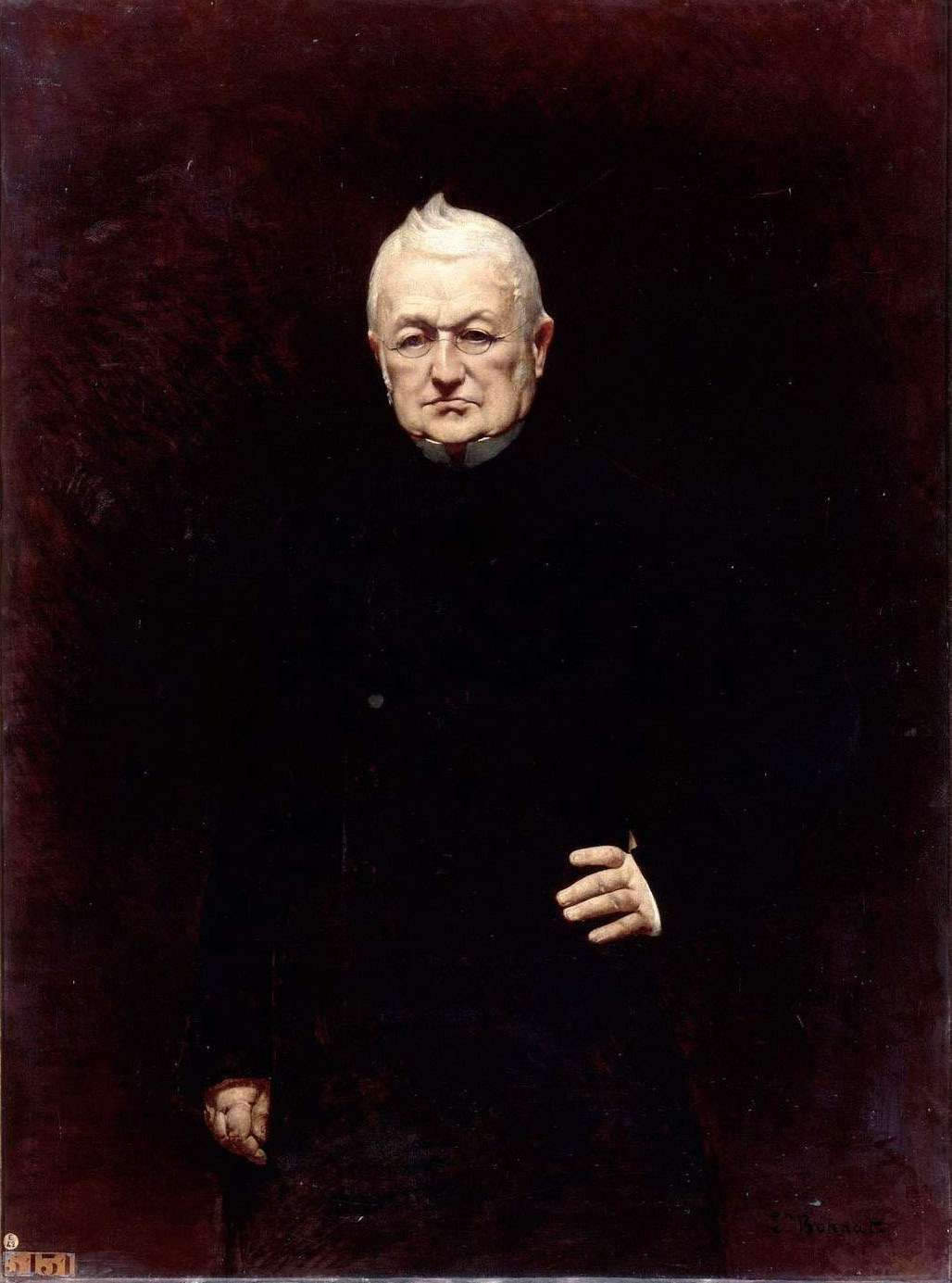
Adolphe Thiers, President of France from 1871 to 1873, and Prime Minister of France from Feb to Sep 1836 and from Mar to Oct 1840

| State/Government | Leader/Deputy Leader | Office |
|---|---|---|
| Algeria | Smail Hamdani | Prime Minister: 1998–1999 |
| Angola | Fernando José de França Dias Van-Dúnem | Prime Minister: 1991–1992; 1996–1999 |
| Bulgaria | Dimitar Grekov | Prime Minister: Jan–Oct 1899 |
| Bulgaria | Vasil Kolarov | Chairman of the Provisional Government: 1946–1947; Prime Minister: 1949–1950 |
| Bulgaria | Nikola Mushanov | Prime Minister: 1931–1934 |
| Cambodia | Sok Chenda Sophea | Deputy Prime Minister: 2023–present |
| Cambodia | Norodom Ranariddh | Prime Minister: 1993–1997 |
| Cameroon | Simon Achidi Achu | Prime Minister: 1992–1996 |
| Comoros | Idi Nadhoim | Vice-President: 2006–2011 |
| Egypt | Ahmed Zeiwar Pasha | Prime Minister: 1924–1926 |
| France | Édouard Balladur | Minister of State: 1986–1988; Prime Minister: 1993–1995 |
| France | Jean-Jacques-Régis de Cambacérès | Second Consul: 1799–1804 |
| France | Gaston Defferre | Minister of State: 1981–1983; 1984–1986 |
| France | Félix Gouin | President of the Provisional Government/Prime Minister: Jan–Jun 1946; Minister of State: 1946–1947 |
| France | Maurice Rouvier | Prime Minister: May–Dec 1887; 1905–1906 |
| France | Adolphe Thiers | Prime Minister: Feb–Sep 1836; Mar–Oct 1840; President: 1871–1873 |
| Lebanon | Émile Eddé | Prime Minister: 1929–1930; President: 1936–1941; Nov 1943 |
| Luxembourg | Paulette Lenert | First Deputy Prime Minister: 2022–2023 |
| Mali | Boubou Cisse | Prime Minister: 2019–2020 |
| Mali | Modibo Sidibé | Prime Minister: 2007–2011 |
| Mauritius | Ivan Collendavelloo | Deputy Prime Minister: 2016–2020 |
| Mauritius | Antoine Bruni d'Entrecasteaux | Governor: 1787–1789 |
| Mauritius | Pravind Jugnauth | Deputy Prime Minister: 2003–2005; Prime Minister: 2017–2024 |
| Senegal | Aminata Touré | Prime Minister: 2013–2014 |
| Slovakia | Lívia Vašáková | Deputy Prime Minister: May–Oct 2023 |
| Sri Lanka | Chandrika Kumaratunga | Prime Minister: Aug–Nov 1994; President: 1994–2005 |
| Zaire | Likulia Bolongo | Prime Minister: Apr–May 1997 |

=== Foreign politicians and civil servants ===
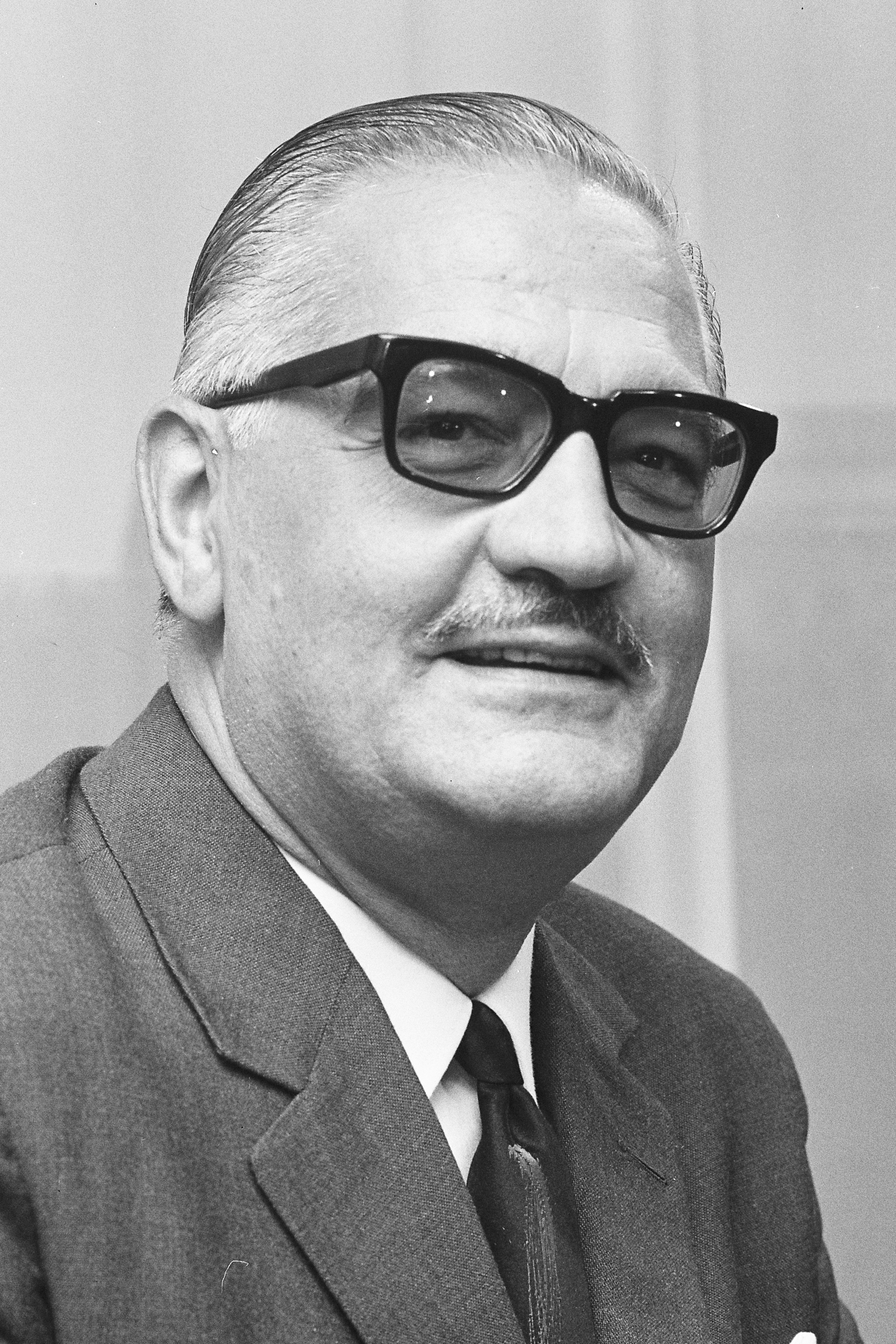
Albert Borschette, European Commissioner for Cohesion and Reforms from 1970 to 1973 and European Commissioner for Competition from 1970 to 1976

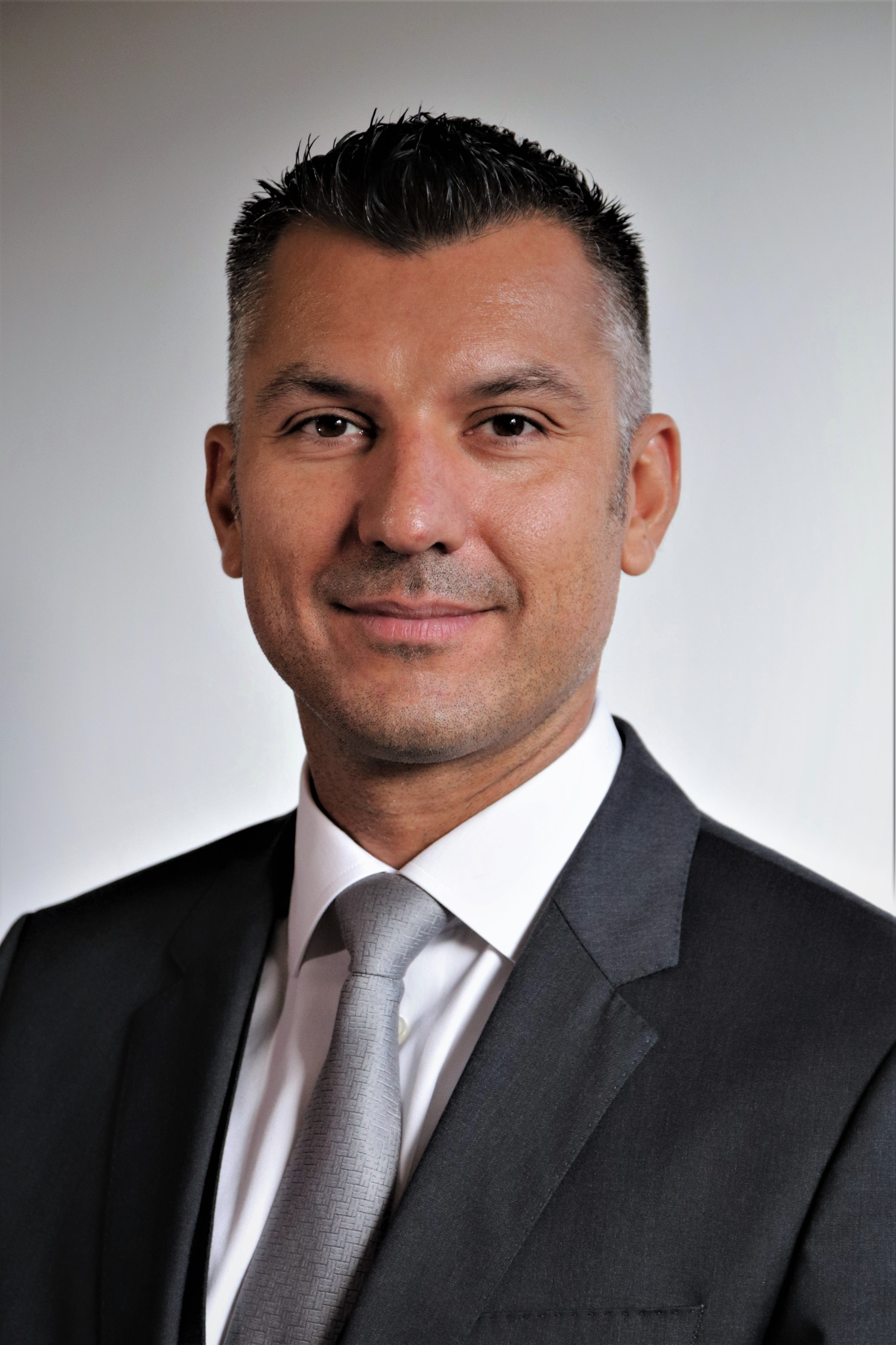
Thomas Brezzo, current President of the National Council of Monaco

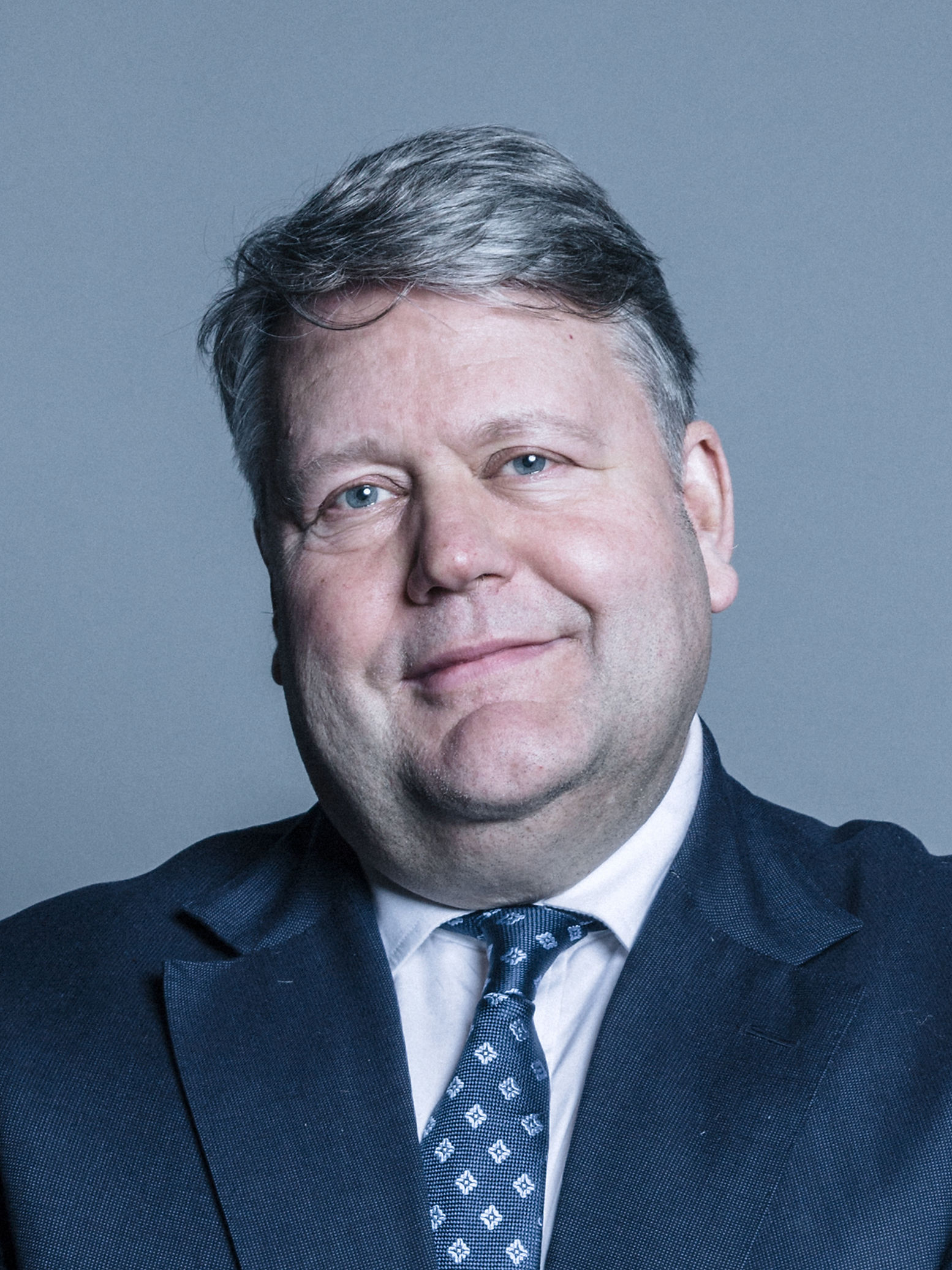
Thomas Galbraith, 2nd Baron Strathclyde, Leader of the House of Lords and Chancellor of the Duchy of Lancaster from 2010 to 2013

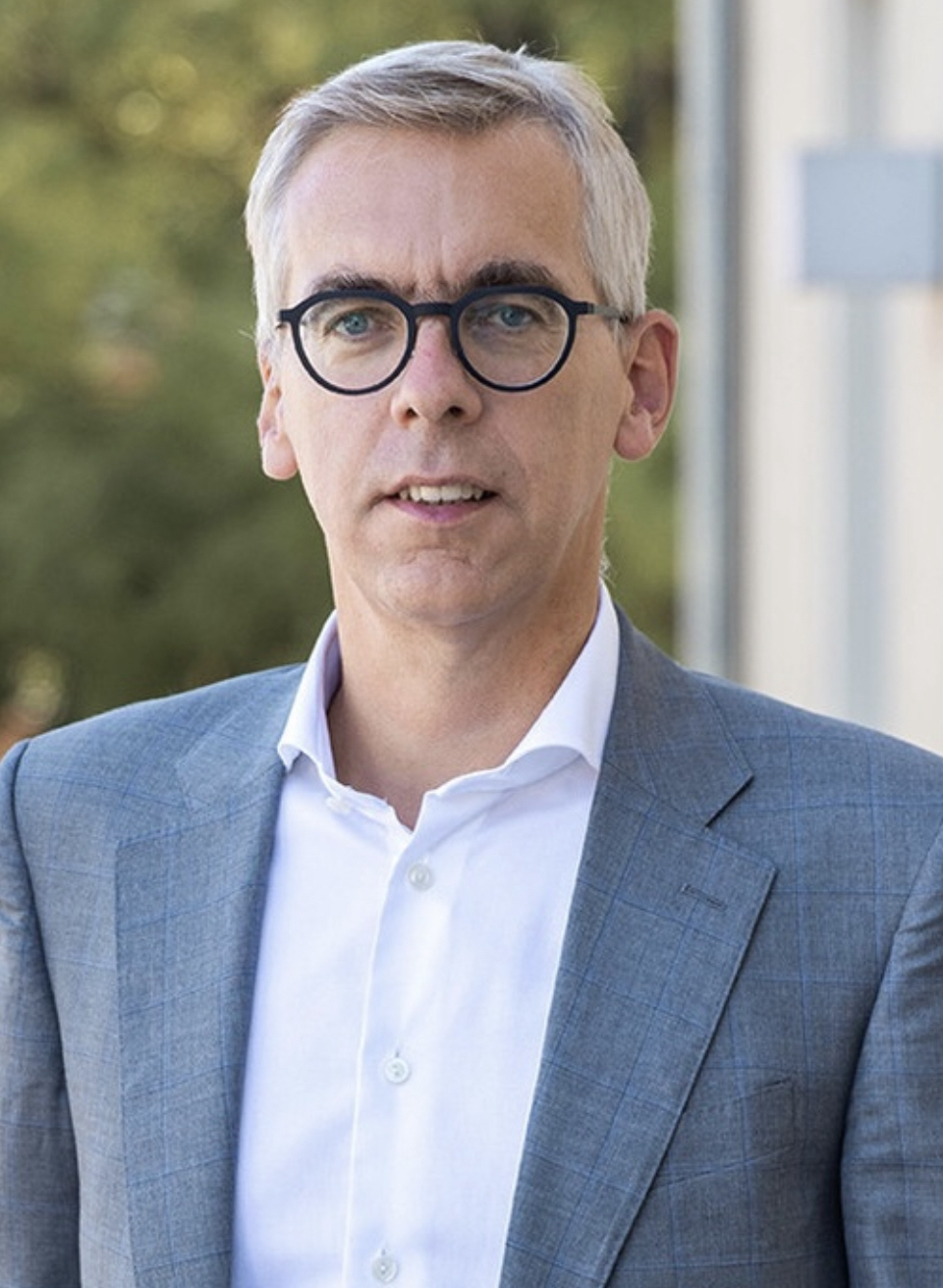
Léon Gloden, current Minister of the Interior of Luxembourg

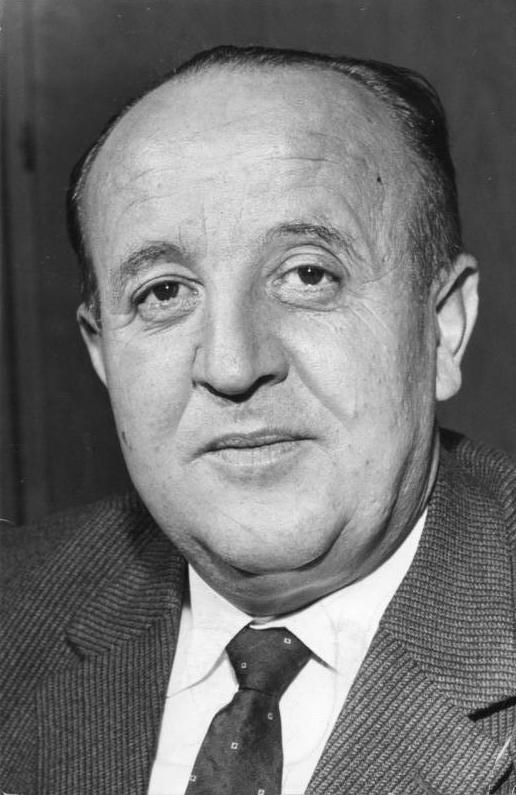
Hermann Höcherl, Minister of the Interior of Germany from 1961 to 1965 and Minister of Agriculture and Food of Germany from 1965 to 1969

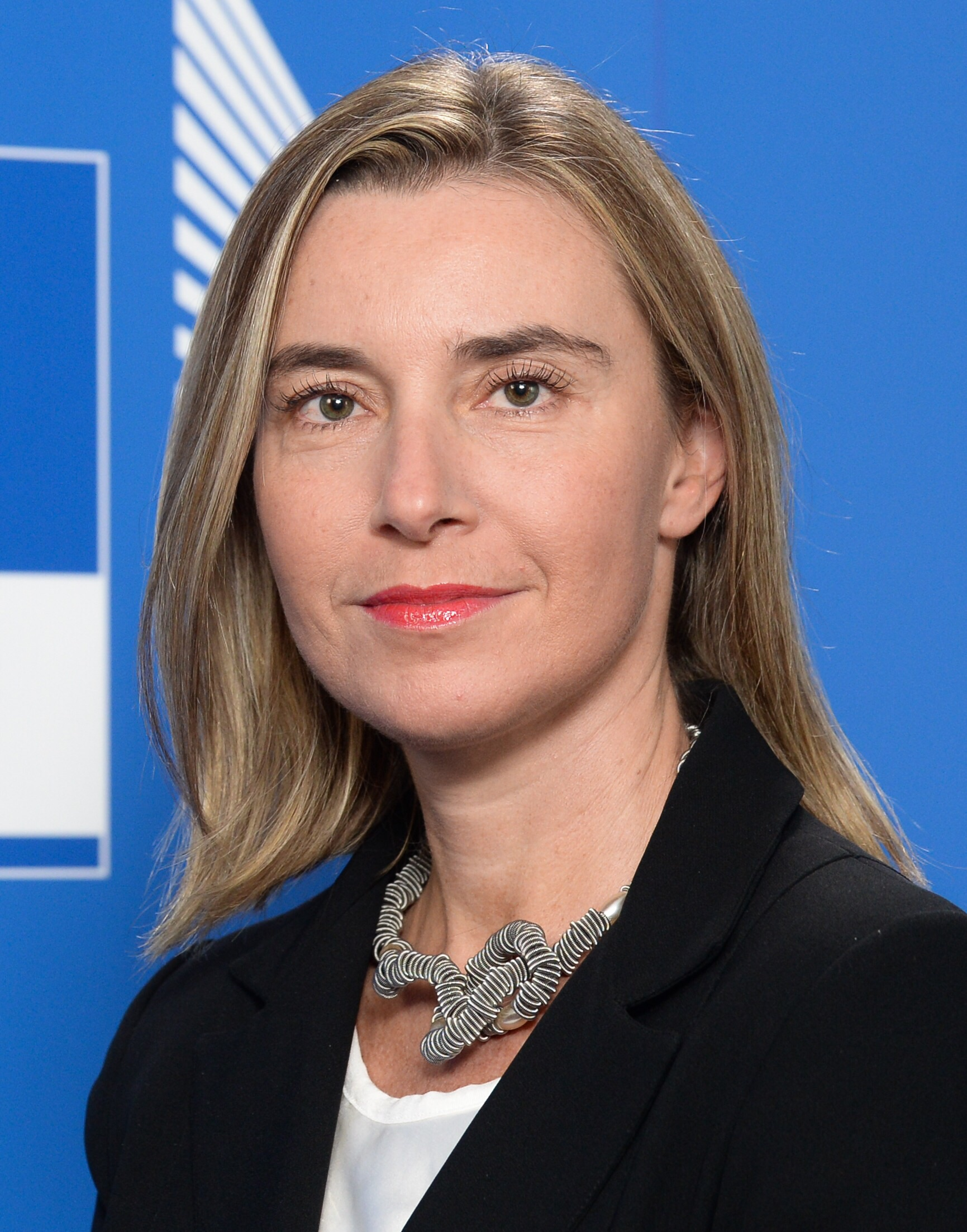
Federica Mogherini, High Representative of the Union for Foreign Affairs and Security Policy and Vice-President of the European Commission from 2014 to 2019

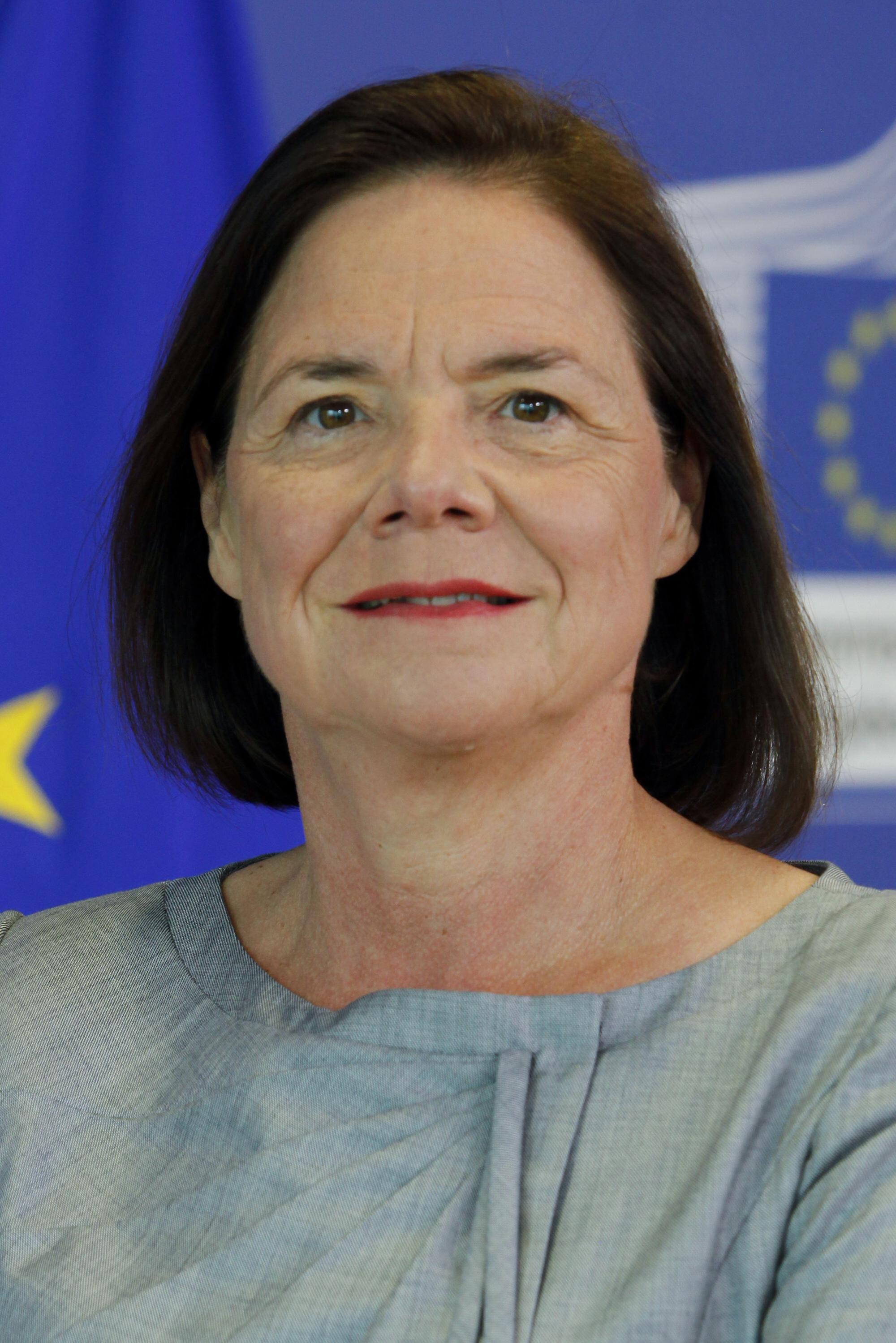
Martine Reicherts, European Commissioner for Home Affairs from Jul to Nov 2014

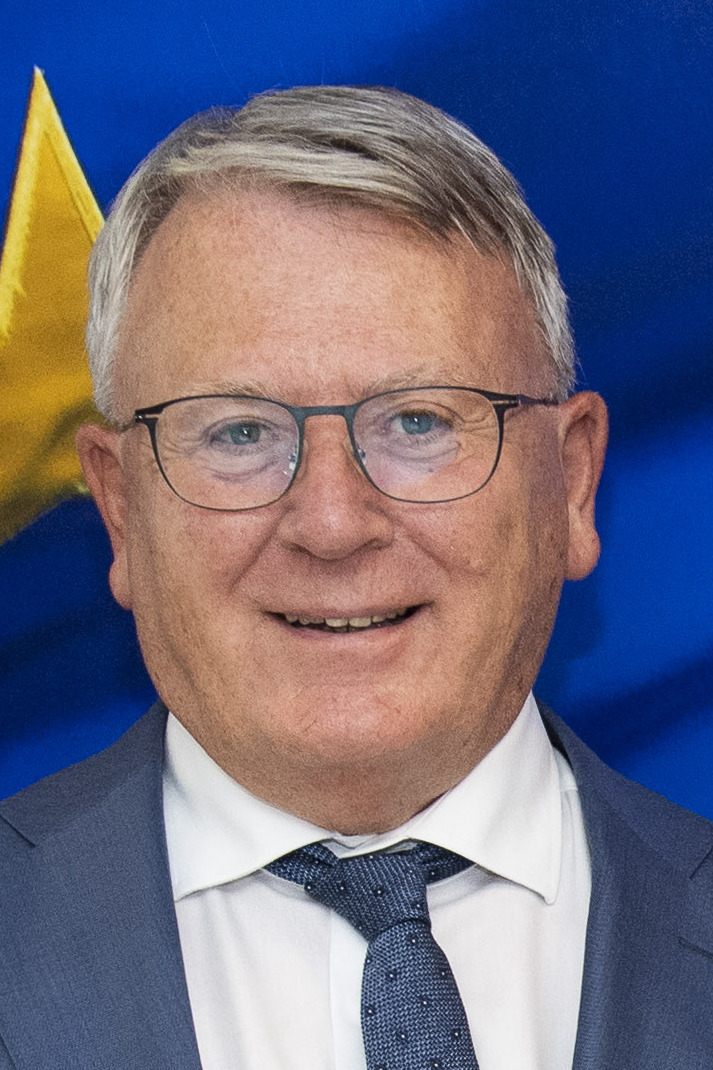
Nicolas Schmit, European Commissioner for Jobs and Social Rights from 2019 to 2024

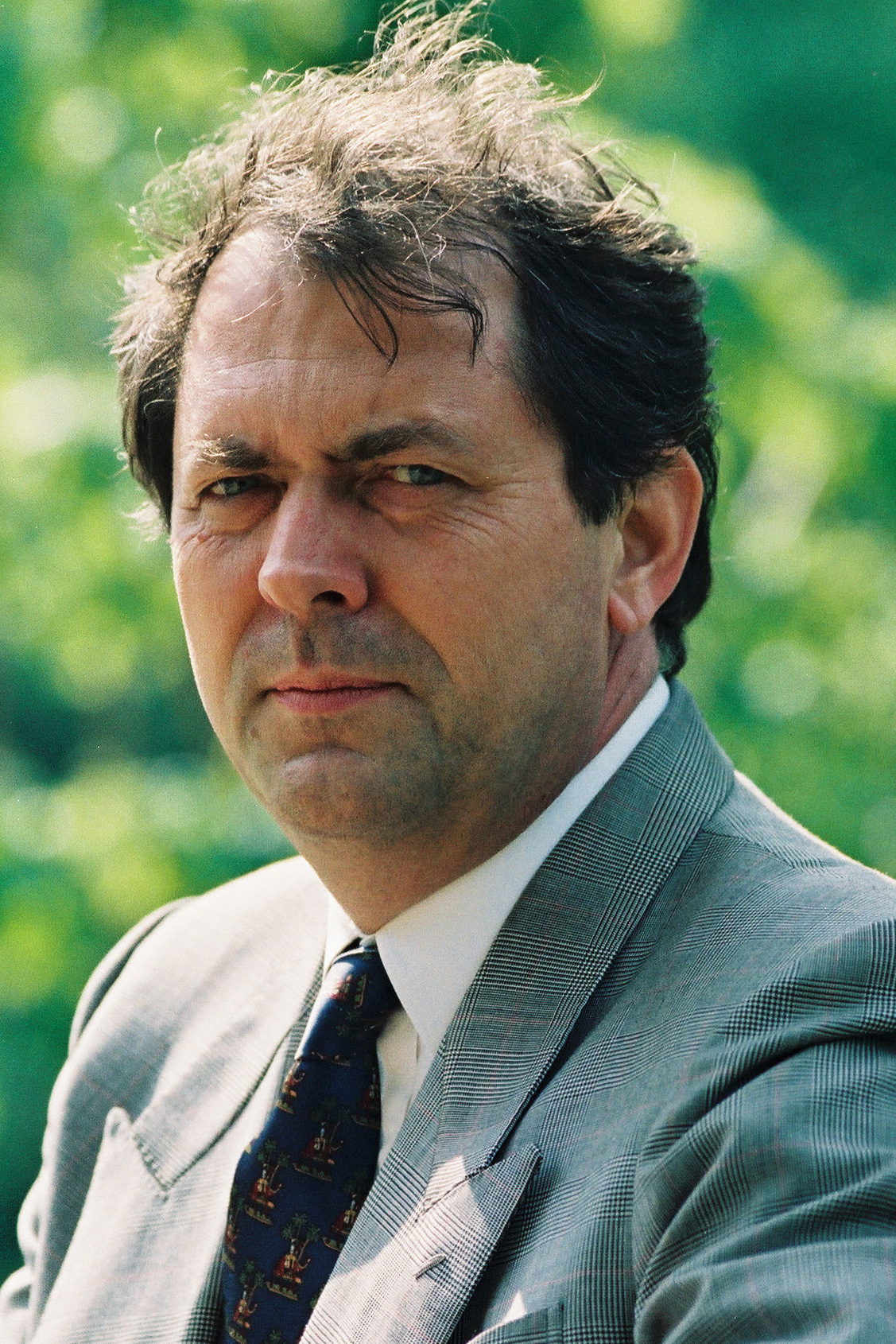
René Steichen, European Commissioner for Agriculture and Food from 1992 to 1995

- Mohamed Abbou – Minister Delegate for Industry, Trade, Investment and the Digital Economy of Morocco: 2013–2016; Minister Delegate for Public Sector Modernization of Morocco: 2007–2010; Member of the House of Representatives of Morocco: 1997–2011
- Ragab Muftah Abudabus – Libyan member of the Pan-African Parliament (PAP): 2004–2009
- Carlos Arellano Lennox – President of the National Assembly of Panama: Mar–Aug 1990; Member of the National Assembly of Panama: 1984–1991
- Nassirou Bako Arifari – Minister of Foreign Affairs of Benin: 2011–2015
- Lucie Milebou Aubusson – President of the Senate of Gabon: 2015–2023
- Nizar Baraka – Minister of Economy and Finance of Morocco: 2012–2013; President of the Social, Economic and Environmental Council: 2013–2018; Minister of Equipment and Water of Morocco: 2021–present
- Simone Beissel – Member of the Chamber of Deputies of Luxembourg: 1999–2004/2013–2018/2018–2023/2023–present
- Driss Benzekri – Moroccan left-wing political and human rights activist
- Nicolae Blaremberg – Minister of Justice of Romania: Nov 1891
- Albert Borschette – European Commissioner for Cohesion and Reforms: 1970–1973; European Commissioner for Competition: 1970–1976
- Jacques Bouiti – Minister of Public Health of the Democratic Republic of the Congo: 1968–1970
- Thomas Brezzo – Member of the National Council of Monaco: 2018–present; President of the National Council of Monaco: 2024–present
- Brian Campion – American politician, member of the Vermont House of Representatives
- Céline Caron-Dagioni – Counsellor for Equipment, Environment, and Urban Planning of Monaco: 2021–present
- Pascal Chabi Kao – Minister of Labour of Benin: 1966–1967; Minister of Economy and Finance of Benin: 1967–1968/1970–1972
- Norodom Chakravuth – Member of the Cambodian Royal Family; President of FUNCINPEC: 2022–present; Member of the National Assembly of Cambodia: 2023–present
- Adolfo Costa du Rels – President of the Council of the League of Nations: 1940–1946; Minister of Foreign Affairs of Bolivia: 1948; Bolivian Ambassador to France: 1948–1952
- Francis Covi – President of the National Assembly of Benin: 1959–1960; Member of the National Assembly of Benin: 1959–1963
- Piotr Czauderna – Member of the National Development Council of Poland: 2015–present
- Nigel Davies – Member of Parliament of the United Kingdom for Epping: 1950–1951
- Norodom Rattana Devi – Cambodian Princess; Member of the National Assembly of Cambodia: 2003–2008; Vice-President of FUNCINPEC: 2022–present
- Henriette Diabaté – Minister of Culture of Ivory Coast: 1990–1993/2000; Minister of Justice of Ivory Coast: 2003–2005
- Fatou Diane – Minister of Women, Family, and Child Protection of Senegal: 2022–present
- Issa Doubragne – Minister of Economy, Development Planning and International Cooperation of the Republic of Chad: 2018–2022
- Emile Doumba – Minister of Finance and Economy of Gabon: 1999–2002; Minister of Forestry, Water, Fisheries and National Parks of Gabon: 2002–2009; Minister of Urban and Regional Planning of Gabon: Jun–Jul 2009; Minister of Energy, Hydraulic Resources, and New Energies of Gabon: Jul–Oct 2009
- Mohamed Ould El Abed – Minister for Economic Affairs and Development of Mauritania: 2005–2007
- Aziz El Houssine – Minister of Civil Service and Administrative Reform of Morocco: 1998–2000
- Joëlle Elvinger – Member of the Chamber of Deputies of Luxembourg: 2013–2019
- Nicholas Fattoush – Minister of Tourism of Lebanon: 1992–1998; Minister of State for Parliamentary Affairs of Lebanon: 2011–2014
- Hao Feng-ming – Acting Minister of Labour of Taiwan: Jul–Aug 2014; Deputy Minister of Labour of Taiwan: 2014–2016
- Jean-François Ferrari – Member of the National Assembly of Seychelles: 2016–2020; Designated Minister and Minister of Fisheries of Seychelles: 2020–2025
- Thomas Galbraith, 2nd Baron Strathclyde – Leader of the House of Lords and Chancellor of the Duchy of Lancaster: 2010–2013
- Tiémoko Marc Garango – Minister of Finance of Burkina Faso: 1966–1976
- Stanislav Gavronsky – Member of the State Council of the Russian Empire: 1906–1907
- Léon Gloden – Minister of the Interior of Luxembourg: 2023–present; Member of the Chamber of Deputies of Luxembourg: 2009–2023
- Bernard Gousse – Minister of Justice and Public Security of Haiti: 2004–2005
- Hermann Höcherl – Minister of the Interior of Germany: 1961–1965; Minister of Food, Agriculture and Consumer Protection of Germany: 1965–1969
- Hu Sishe – Member of the Standing Committee of the National Committee of the Chinese People's Political Consultative Conference: 2023–present
- Idriss Azami Al Idrissi – Minister Delegate for the Budget of Morocco: 2012–2016; Minister of Economy and Finance of Morocco: 2013–2017; Member of the House of Representatives of Morocco: 2016–2021
- Yule F. Kilcher – Member of the Alaska State Senate: 1963–1966
- Mamadou Koulibaly – President of the National Assembly of Côte d'Ivoire: 2001–2012
- Abdou Labo – Minister of Defense of Nigeria: 1994–1995; Minister of Equipment of Nigeria: 2000–2002; Minister of State for Sports and Culture of Nigeria: 2002–2004; Minister of State for Hydraulics of Nigeria: 2004–2007; Minister of State for the Interior of Nigeria: 2011–2013; Minister of State for Agriculture of Nigeria: 2013–2014
- Sven Lehmann – Member of the German Bundestag: 2017–present
- Luzolo Bambi Lessa – Minister of Justice of the Democratic Republic of the Congo: 2008–2012
- Vishnu Lutchmeenaraidoo – Minister of Finance and Economic Development of Mauritius: 1983–1991/2014–2015; Minister of Foreign Affairs of Mauritius: 2016–2019
- Tshiunza Mbiye – Minister for the Economy of the Democratic Republic of the Congo: Feb–Aug 1987
- Penda Mbow – Minister of Culture of Senegal: 2001
- Mattea Meyer – Member of the Swiss National Council: 2015–2019/2019–present
- Stoyan Mihaylovski – Member of the National Assembly of Bulgaria: 1886–1887/1894–1896/1903–1908
- Kunio Mikuriya – Secretary General of the World Customs Organization (WCO): 2009–2023
- Federica Mogherini – Minister of Foreign Affairs of Italy: Feb–Oct 2014; High Representative of the Union for Foreign Affairs and Security Policy and Vice-President of the European Commission: 2014–2019
- Zakaria Ben Mustapha – Minister of Culture of Tunisia: 1986–1987/1987–1988; Mayor of Tunis: 1980–1986
- Robert Nkili – Minister of Transport of Cameroon: 2011–2015; Minister of Labour and Social Welfare of Cameroon: 2002–2011
- Camélia Ntoutoume – Minister of State/Minister of National Education and Vocational Training of Gabon: 2022–2025/2026–present; Member of the National Assembly of Gabon: 2025–2026; Minister Delegate of Higher Education of Gabon: 2020–2022
- Benoît Pelletier – Minister of Canadian Intergovernmental Affairs: 2003–2008; Leader of the Government in Parliament: 2007–2008
- Josué Pierre-Louis – Minister of Justice and Public Security of Haiti: Oct–Nov 2011
- Saraha Georget Rabeharisoa – Malagasy politician and president of the Madagascar Green Party
- Césaire Rabenoro – Minister of Foreign Affairs of Madagascar: 1991–1993
- Daniel Rajakoba – Malagasy politician, founder of the Fihavanantsika party
- Richard Randriamandrato – Minister of Economy and Finance of Madagascar: 2019–2021; Minister of Foreign Affairs of Madagascar: Mar–Oct 2022
- Roy Reding – Member of the Chamber of Deputies of Luxembourg: 2013–2023
- Martine Reicherts – European Commissioner for Home Affairs: Jul–Nov 2014; Director-General of DG Education and Culture (DG EAC): 2015–2018
- Valérie Rossi – Member of the National Council of Monaco: 2013–2018
- Manuela Rottmann – Member of the German Bundestag: 2017–2024
- Amor Rourou – Minister of Industry, Energy and Mines of Tunisia: 1979–1980
- Johnson Roussety – Chief Commissioner of Rodrigues, Mauritius: 2006–2011/2022–2024
- Nicolas Schmit – European Commissioner for Social Rights and Skills, Quality Jobs and Preparedness: 2019–2024; Minister of Labour, Employment and Immigration of Luxembourg: 2013–2018
- Delly Sesanga – Minister for Planning of the Democratic Republic of the Congo: Mar–Oct 2006; Member of the National Assembly of the Democratic Republic of the Congo: 2006–present
- Iain Sproat – Minister for Sport and Tourism (UK): 1993–1997; Member of Parliament for Harwich: 1992–1997; Member of Parliament for Aberdeen South: 1970–1983
- René Steichen – European Commissioner for Agriculture and Food: 1992–1995; Luxembourgish European Commissioner: 1992–1995
- Jeremy Stine – Member of the Louisiana State Senate: 2022–present; Majority Leader of the Louisiana State Senate: 2024–present
- Jorge Telerman – Argentine politician and journalist, the 4th Chief of Government of Buenos Aires City
- Roland Theis – Member of the German Bundestag: 2025–present
- Herdis Thorgeirsdottir – Icelandic lawyer and political scientist, candidate for president in the 2012 Icelandic presidential election; First Vice-President of the Venice Commission: 2013–present
- Erik Ullenhag – Minister of Integration of Sweden: 2010–2014; Leader of the Liberal People's Party in the Swedish Riksdag: 2014–2016
- Natália Pedro da Costa Umbelina Neto – Minister of Foreign Affairs, Cooperation and Communities of São Tomé and Príncipe: 2012–2014
- Fátima Veiga – Minister of Foreign Affairs of Cape Verde: 2002–2004
- Manuel Veiga – Minister of Culture of Cape Verde: 2004–2011
- Stéphanie Weydert – Member of the Chamber of Deputies of Luxembourg: 2023–present; Mayor of Rosport-Mompach: 2022–present
- Victorine Gboko Wodié – Minister for Human Rights of Ivory Coast: 2003–2005

=== French politicians and civil servants ===
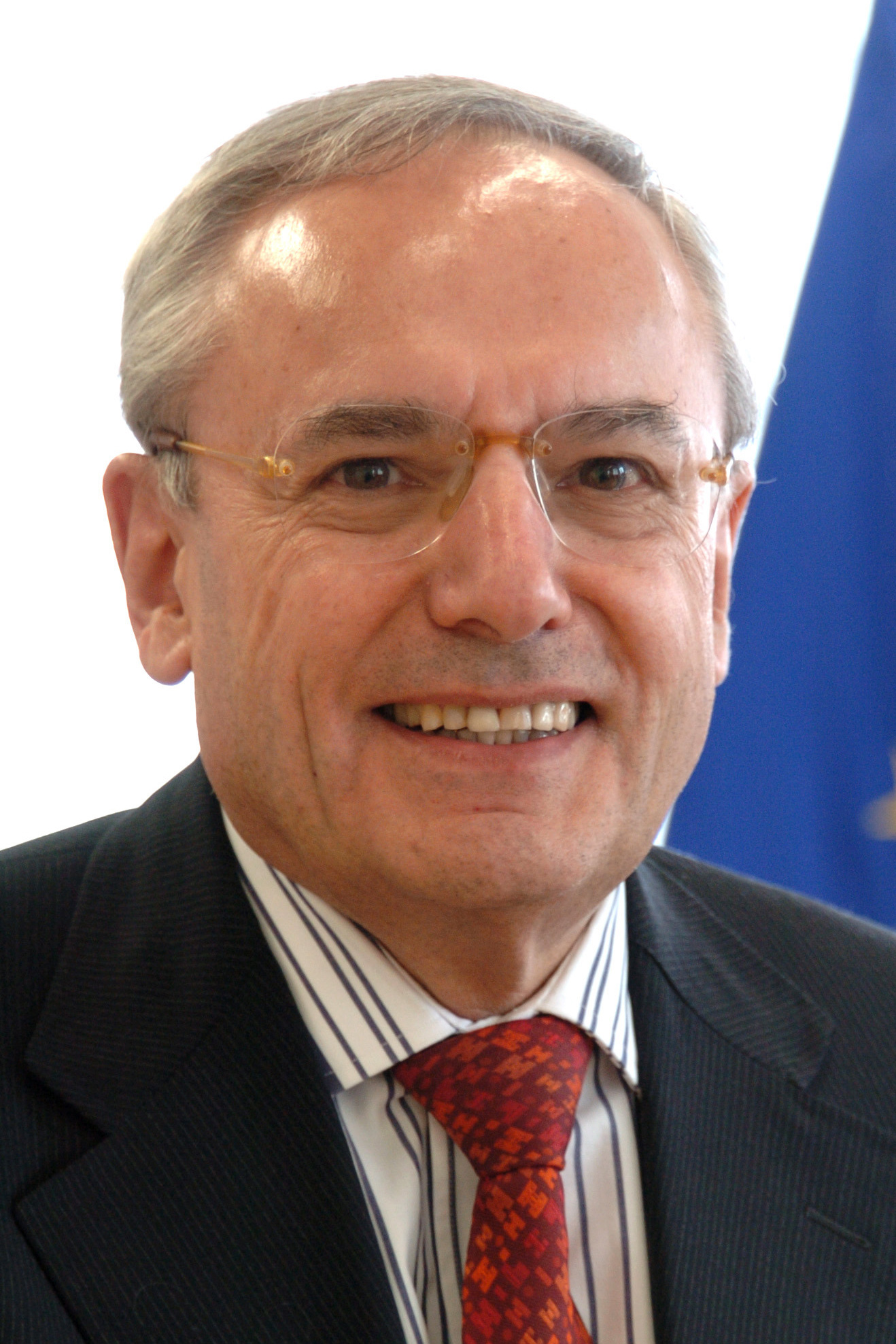
Jacques Barrot, French European Commissioner and Vice-President of the European Commission from 2004 to 2010

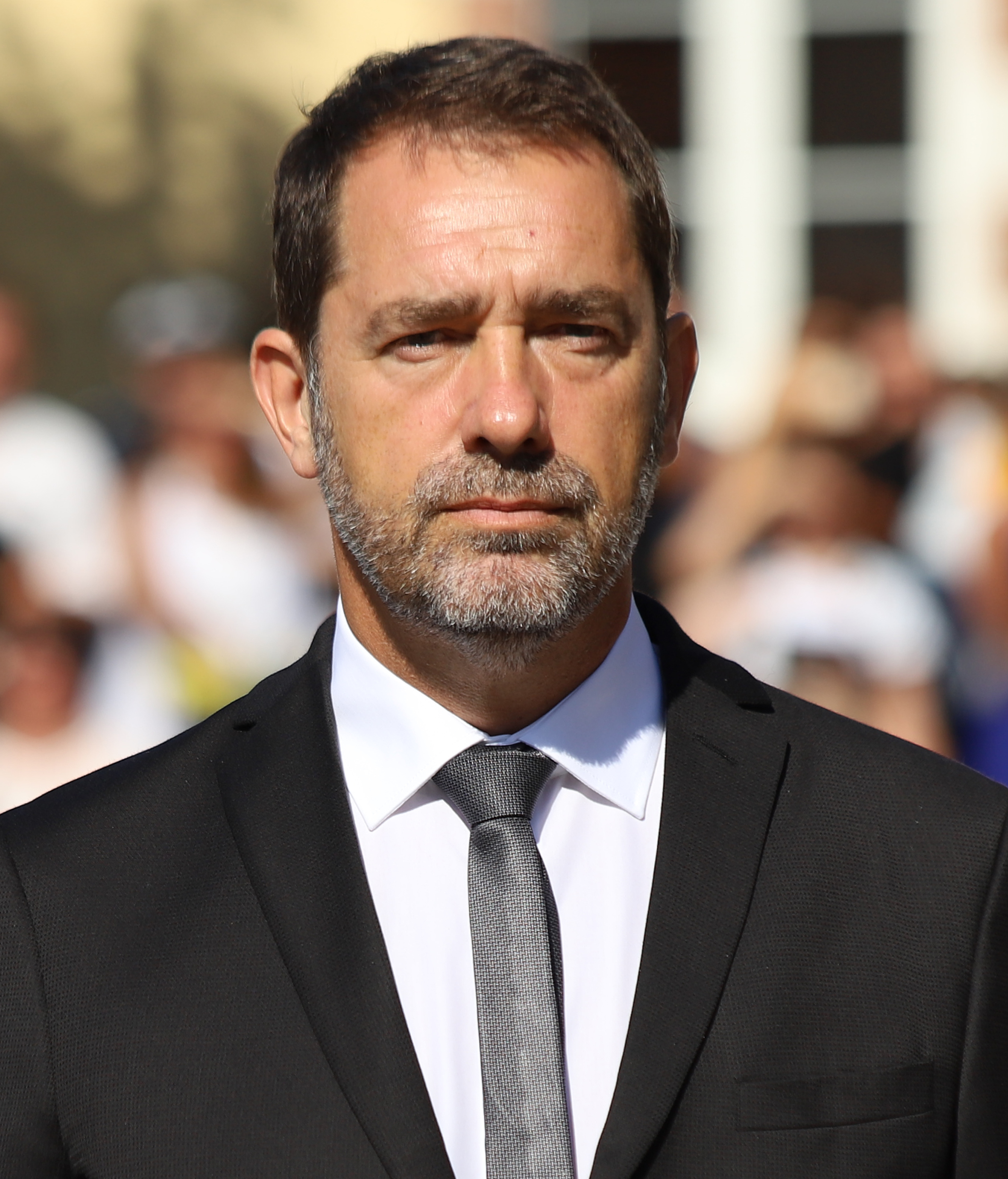
Christophe Castaner, Minister of the Interior of France from 2018 to 2020

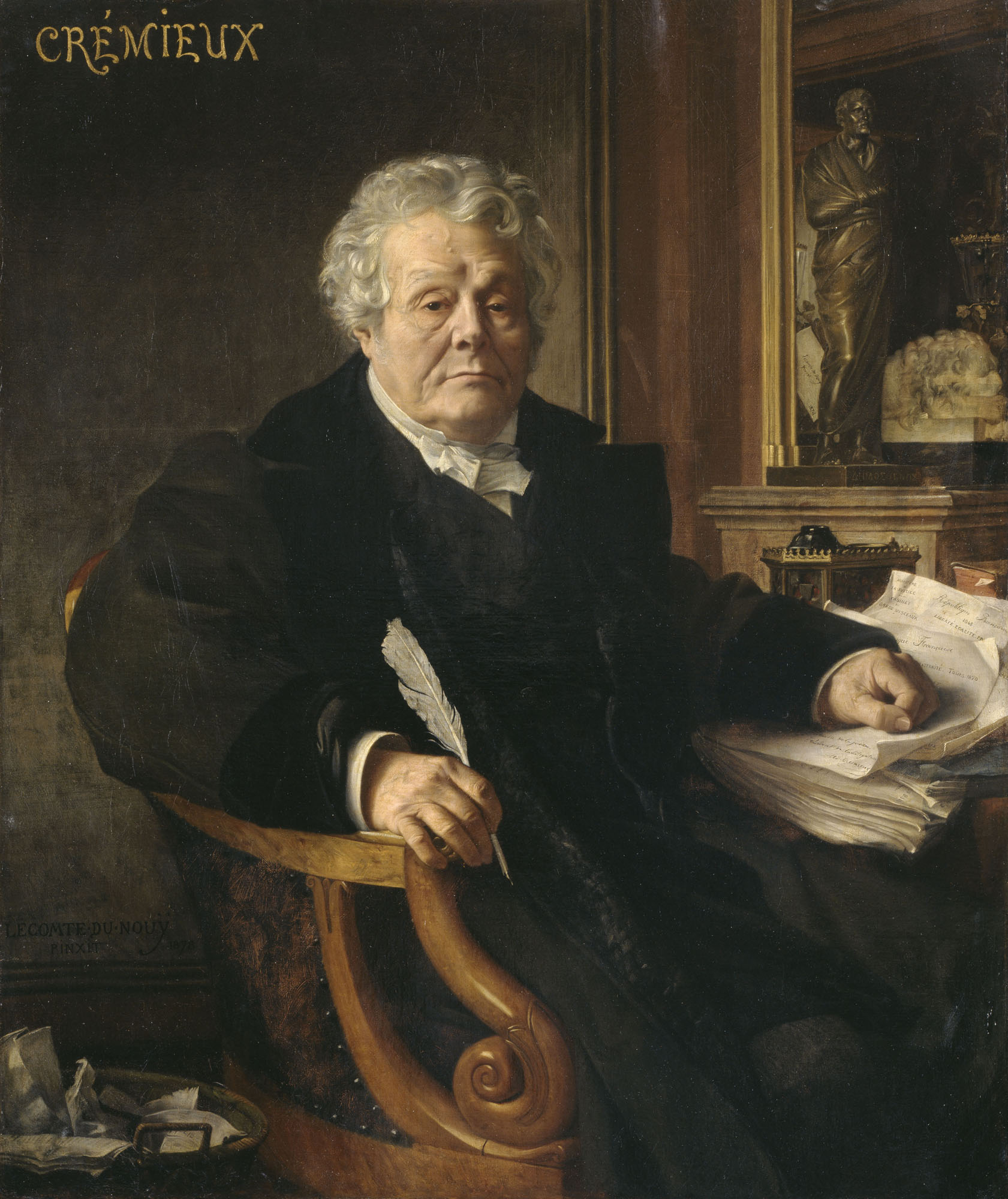
Adolphe Crémieux, Minister of Justice of France from Feb to Jun 1848 and from 1870 to 1871

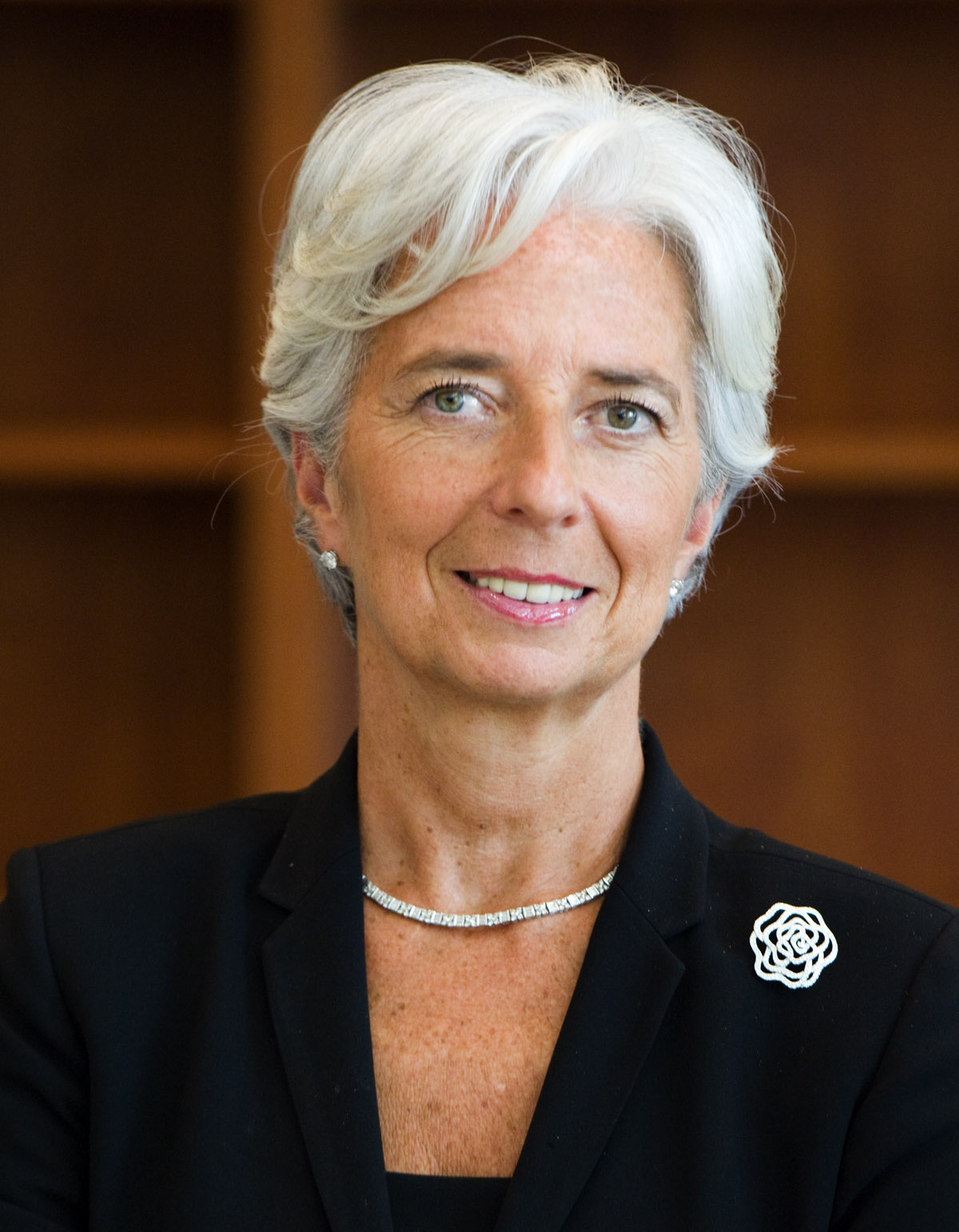
Christine Lagarde, 4th and current President of the European Central Bank (ECB), and Managing Director of the International Monetary Fund (IMF) from 2011 to 2019

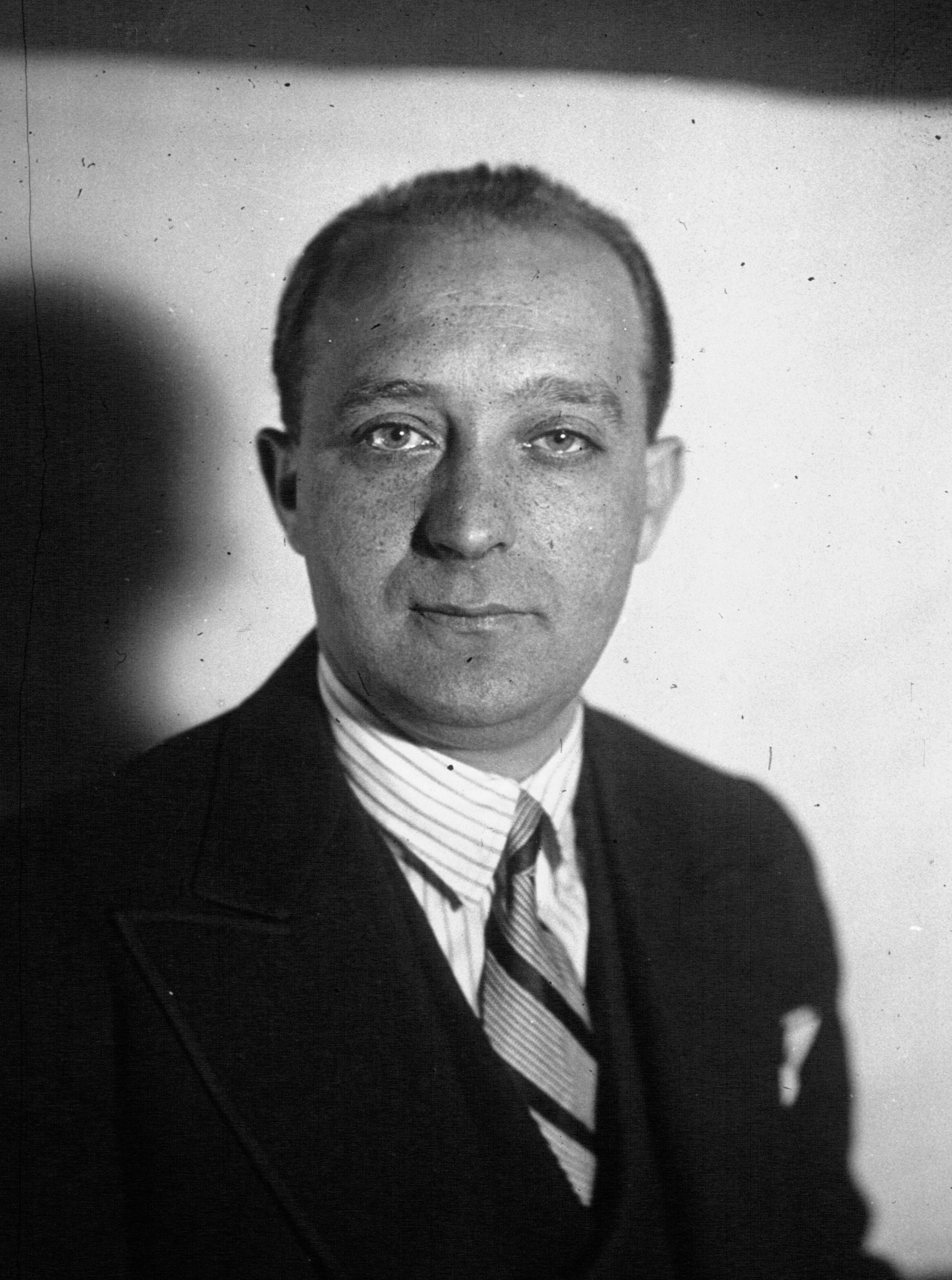
Léon Martinaud-Déplat, Minister of Justice of France from 1952 to 1953 and Minister of the Interior of France from 1953 to 1954

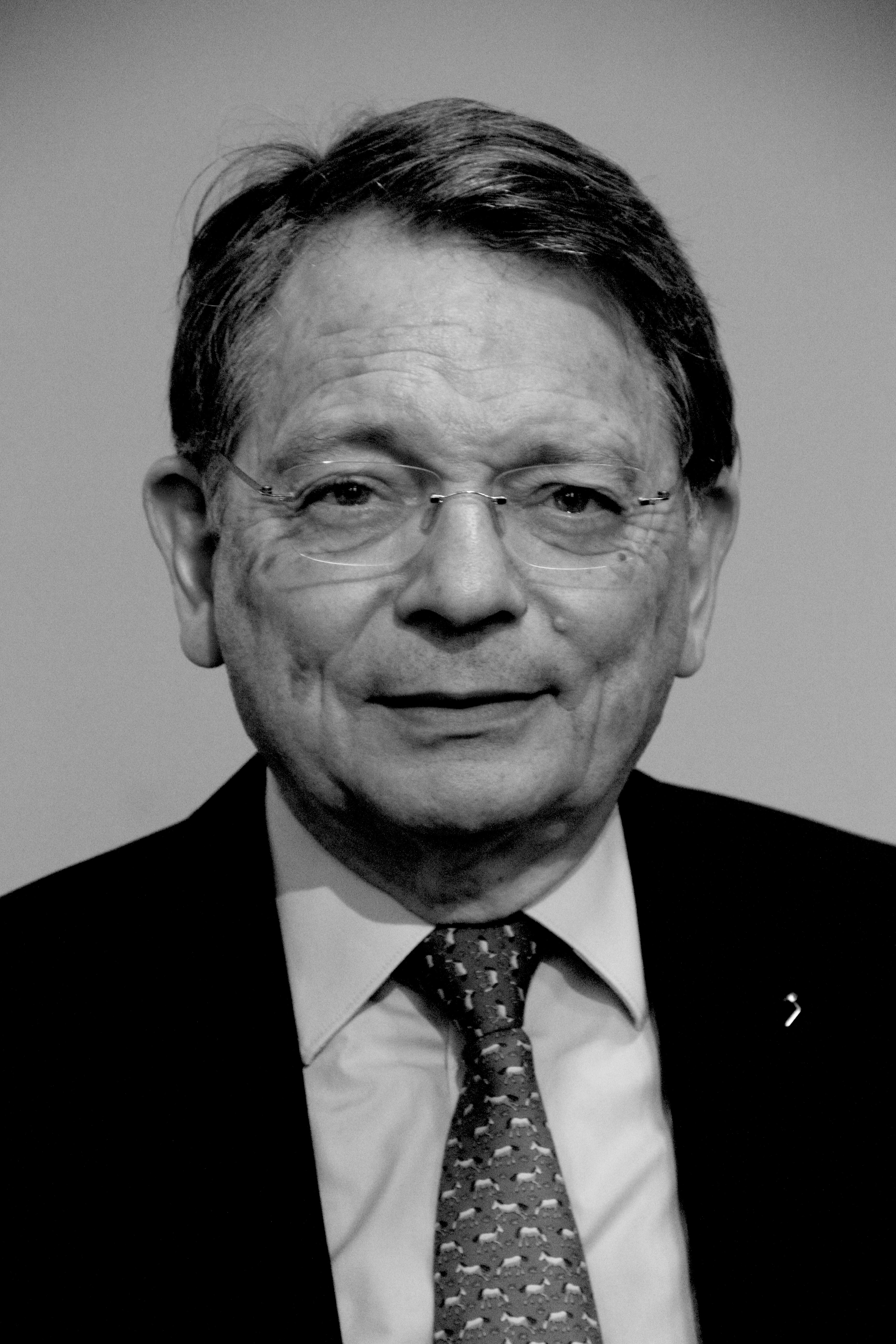
Jean-François Mattei, Minister of Health of France from 2002 to 2004

- Benjamin Abram – Mayor of Aix-en-Provence: 1888–1896
- Yann Aguila – Councillor of State of France: 1990–2010
- René Arthaud – Minister of Health of France: Jun–Dec 1946; Deputy: 1945–1951
- Antoine Aude – Mayor of Aix-en-Provence: 1835–1848
- Félix Baret – Mayor of Marseille: 1887–1892
- Jacques Barrot – Member of the Constitutional Council of France: 2010–2014; Vice-President of the European Commission: 2004–2010; European Commissioner for Justice, Fundamental Rights and Citizenship: 2008–2010; European Commissioner for Transport: 2004–2008; Minister of Labour of France: 1995–1997; Minister of Health of France: 1979–1981; Minister of Commerce and Industry of France: 1978–1979; Deputy: 1967–1974/Mar–May 1978/1981–1986/1986–1988/1988–1995/1997–2004
- Victor Barthélemy – French political activist
- Jassuda Bédarrides – Mayor of Aix-en-Provence: 1848–1849
- Salomon Bédarrides – Mayor of Aix-en-Provence: 1877–1884
- Henry Bergasse – Minister of Veterans Affairs of France: Jan–Jun 1953; Deputy: 1946–1958/1958–1962
- Yves Bertrand – General Director of the Central Directorate of General Intelligence (DCRG): 1992–2004
- Joseph Cabassol – Mayor of Aix-en-Provence: 1902–1908
- Michel Carlini – Mayor of Marseille: 1947–1953; Deputy: 1951–1955
- Christophe Castaner – Minister of the Interior of France: 2018–2020; Deputy: 2012–2017/Jun–Jul 2017/2020–2022
- Jean-Baptiste Amable Chanot – Mayor of Marseille: 1902–1908/1912–1914; Deputy: 1910–1914
- Adolphe Crémieux – Minister of Justice of France: Feb–Jun 1848/1870–1871; Deputy: 1842–1851/1869–1876; French Senator for Life: 1875–1880
- Nicolas Daragon – Minister Delegate for Daily Safety of France: Sep–Dec 2024
- Andrée Defferre-Aboulker – Member of the Provisional Consultative Assembly of France: 1944–1945
- Thomas Degos – Prefect of Mayotte: 2011–2013; Prefect of the Morbihan: 2015–2016
- Blaise Diagne – French politician, the first black African elected to the Chamber of Deputies of France, and the first to hold a position in the Government of France
- Jean Espariat – Mayor of Aix-en-Provence: Feb–Nov 1790; Deputy: 1791–1792
- Charles Giraud – Minister of National Education of France/Minister of Public Worship of France: Jan–Apr/Oct–Dec 1851
- Jean-Dominique Giuliani – Director of the Office of the President of the Senate of France: 1992–1998
- Gustave Heirieis – Mayor of Aix-en-Provence: 1871–1872; Deputy: 1871–1872
- Olivier Henrard – Member of the Council of State of France: 2015–2019
- Alain Joissains – Mayor of Aix-en-Provence: 1978–1983
- Maryse Joissains-Masini – Mayor of Aix-en-Provence: 2001–2021; Deputy: 2002–2007/2007–2012
- Alain Juillet – Director of Intelligence at the Directorate-General for External Security (DGSE): 2002–2003
- Christine Lagarde – President of the European Central Bank (ECB): 2019–present; Managing Director of the International Monetary Fund (IMF): 2011–2019; Minister of the Economy, Industry and Employment of France: 2007–2011; Minister of Agriculture of France: May–Jun 2007
- Pascal Lalle – Director of Active Services at the Central Directorate of Public Security (DCSP): 2012–2019
- Cindy Léoni – Member of the French Economic, Social and Environmental Council: 2015–present; President of SOS Racisme: 2012–2014
- Émile Lisbonne – Minister of Health of France: Oct–Nov 1933/Jan–Feb 1934; Senator: 1924–1939
- Charles-Marie Livon – Mayor of Marseille: Mar–May 1895
- Marceau Long – Vice-President of the Council of State of France: 1987–1995
- Léon Martinaud-Déplat – Minister of the Interior of France: 1953–1954; Minister of Justice of France: 1952–1953; Deputy: 1932–1936/1951–1955
- Philippe Massoni – Head of the Paris Police Prefecture: 1993–2001; Representative of the French Co-Prince of Andorra: 2002–2007
- Jean-François Mattei – Minister of Health of France: 2002–2004; Deputy: 1989–2002/Jun–Jul 2002
- François Mignet – Councillor of State of France: 1830–1848
- Pierre Moitessier – Director of the National Police of France: 1936–1938; Councillor of State of France: 1938–1944
- Jean-Raymond Mouraille – Mayor of Marseille: 1791–1793; Deputy: Sep 1792
- Jules Joseph Onfroy – Mayor of Marseille: 1861–1862
- Émile Rigaud – Mayor of Aix-en-Provence: 1849–1863; Deputy: 1852–1862
- Georges Ripert – Minister of National Education of France: Sep–Dec 1940; Dean of the Sorbonne Faculty of Law: 1937–1944
- Michèle Rubirola – Mayor of Marseille: Jul–Dec 2020
- François Santoni – Co-leader of the FLNC-Canal Historique: 1990–1998; Secretary-General of A Cuncolta Naziunalista for Corse-du-Sud: 1990–1998; Secretary-General of A Cuncolta Indipendentista for Corse-du-Sud: Jun–Sep 1998; Leader of Armata Corsa: 1999–2001
- Jean-Claude Sebag – French politician and lawyer, candidate for president in the 1974 French presidential election
- Gilles Simeoni – President of the Executive Council of Corsica: 2015–present
- Bernard Squarcini – Head of the Directorate of Territorial Surveillance (DST): 2007–2008; Head of the General Directorate for Internal Security (DGSI): 2008–2012
- Patrick Subrémon – Prefect of Haute-Saône: 2000–2003; Prefect of Allier: 2003–2005; Prefect of Eure-et-Loir: 2005–2007; Prefect of Indre-et-Loire: 2007–2009
- Jean-Guy Talamoni – President of the Corsican Assembly: 2015–2021
- Sophie Thibault – President of the 5th Chamber at the Court of Auditors: 2024–present; Prefect of Val-de-Marne: 2021–2024; Prefect of Corrèze: 2011–2013
- Jean-Philippe Thiellay – Councillor of State of France: 2011–present
- Joseph Thierry – Minister of Public Works of France: Mar–Dec 1913; Minister of Finance of France: Mar–Sep 1917; Deputy: 1898–1918
- Joseph Antoine Thomas – Councillor of State of France: 1832–1838; Deputy: 1829–1831
- Milakulo Tukumuli – Vice-President of the Southern Province Assembly, New Caledonia: 2019–present; President of the Oceanian Awakening (EO): 2019–present; Member of the Congress of New Caledonia: 2019–present
- Dominique Vian – Prefect of French Guiana: 1997–1999; Prefect of Ardèche: 1999–2002; Prefect of Guadeloupe: 2002–2004; Prefect of Réunion: 2004–2005; Prefect of Alpes-Maritimes: 2006–2008

=== Members of the National Assembly of France ===
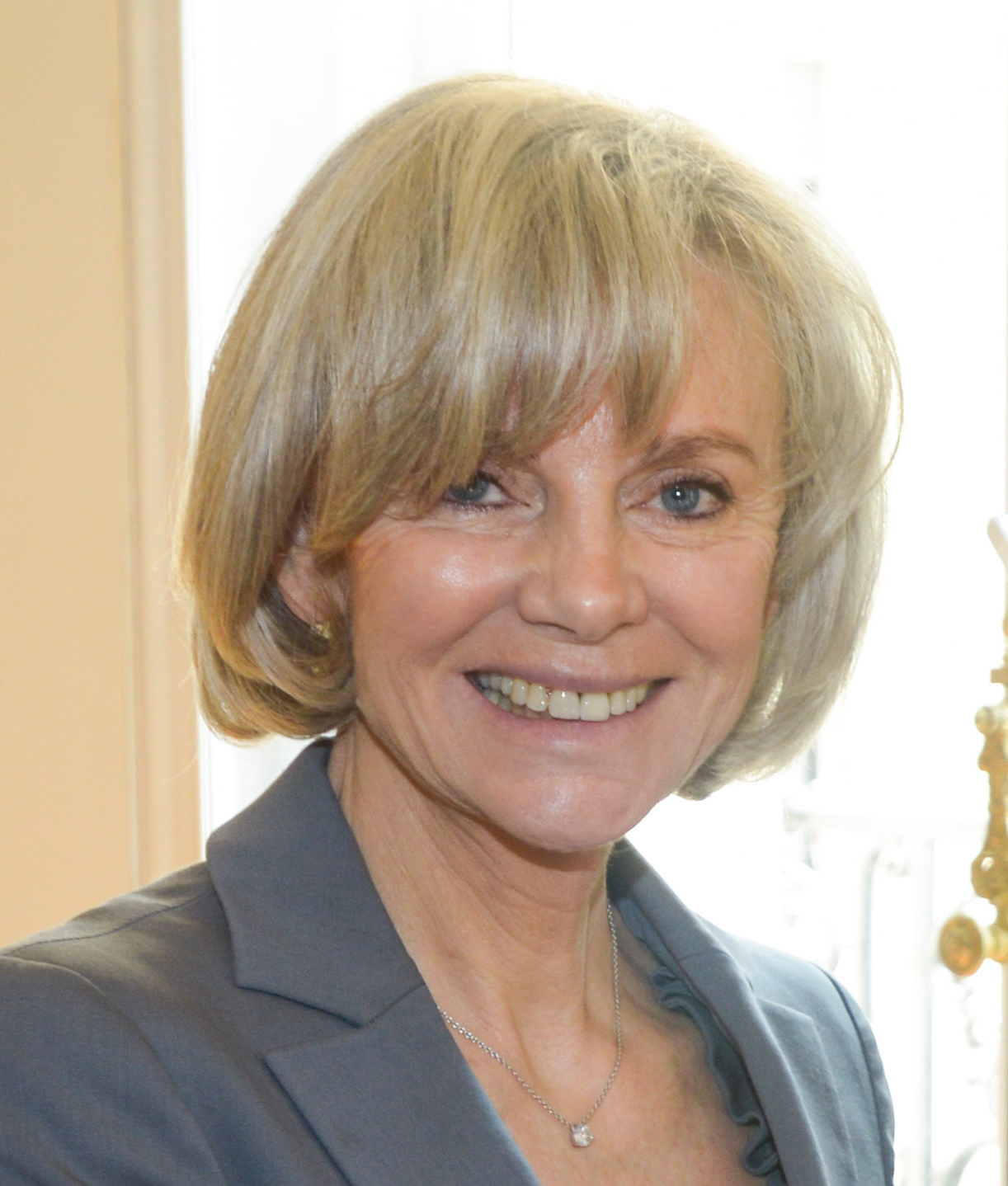
Élisabeth Guigou, Vice-President of the National Assembly of France from 2010 to 2011, Minister of Justice of France from 1997 to 2000, and Minister of Labour of France from 2000 to 2002

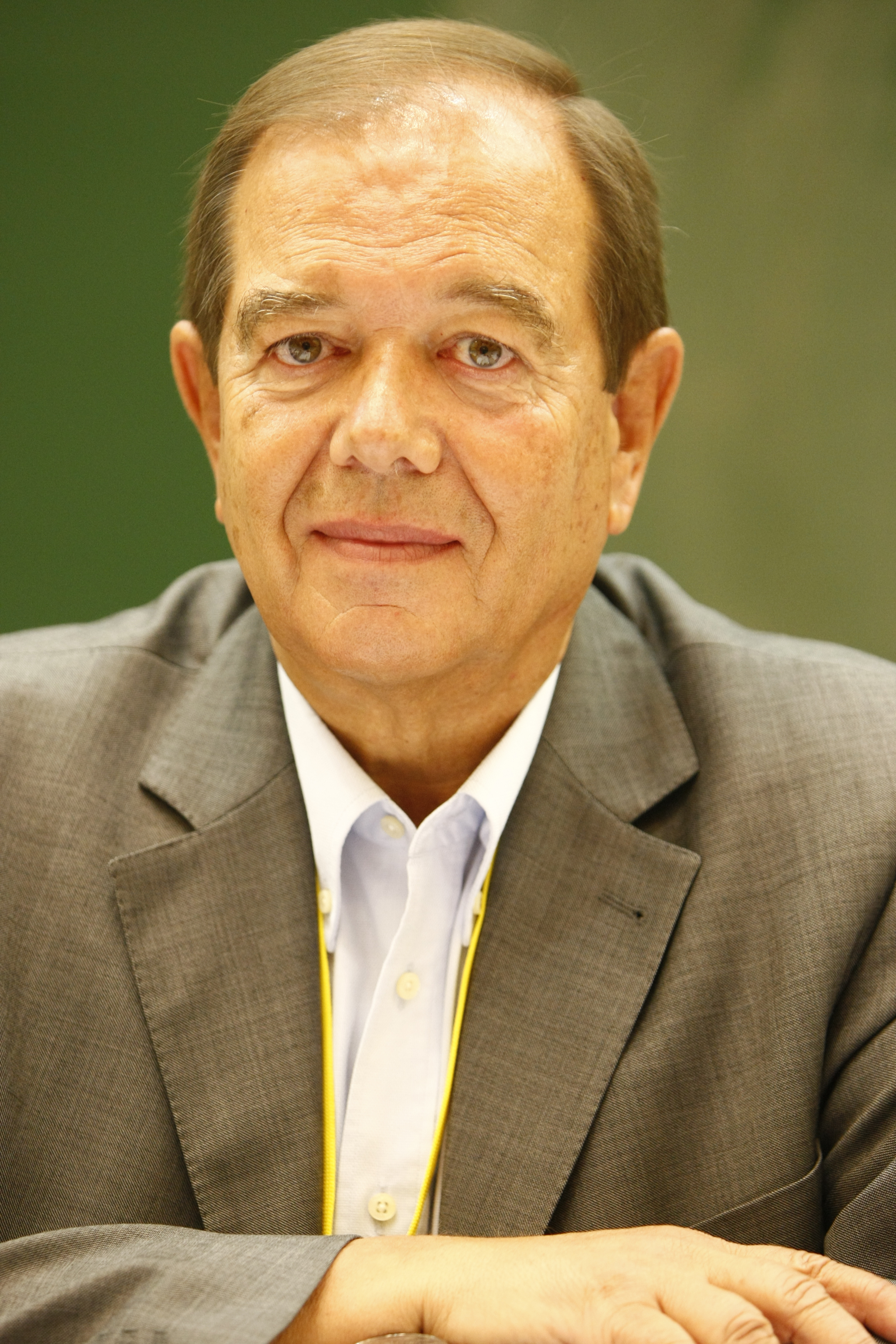
Patrick Ollier, President of the National Assembly of France from Mar to Jun 2007 and Vice-President from 1998 to 2002

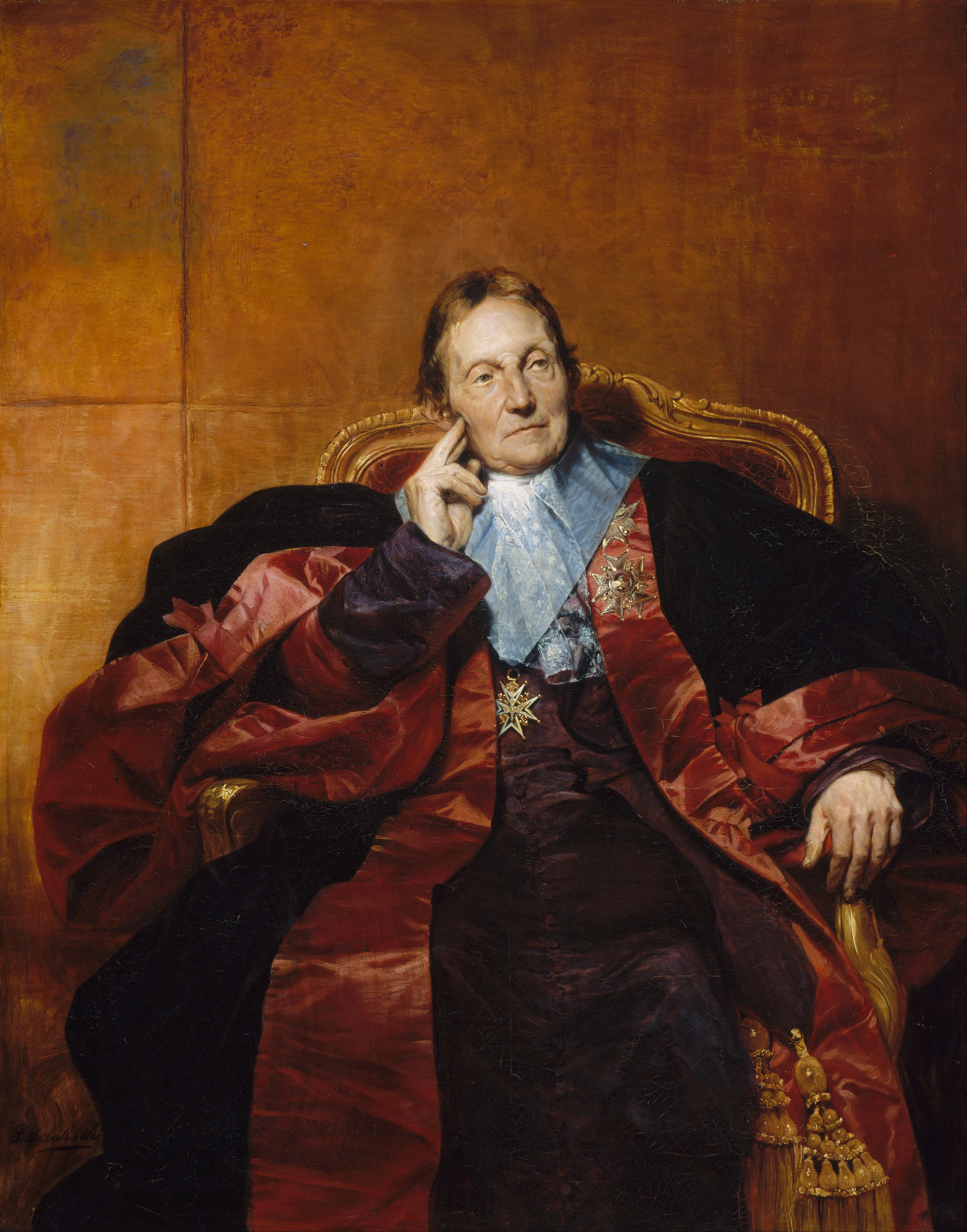
Claude-Emmanuel de Pastoret, President of the National Legislative Assembly of France Oct 1791, President of the Council of Five Hundred from Aug to Sep 1796, and President of the Senate of France from 1829 to 1830

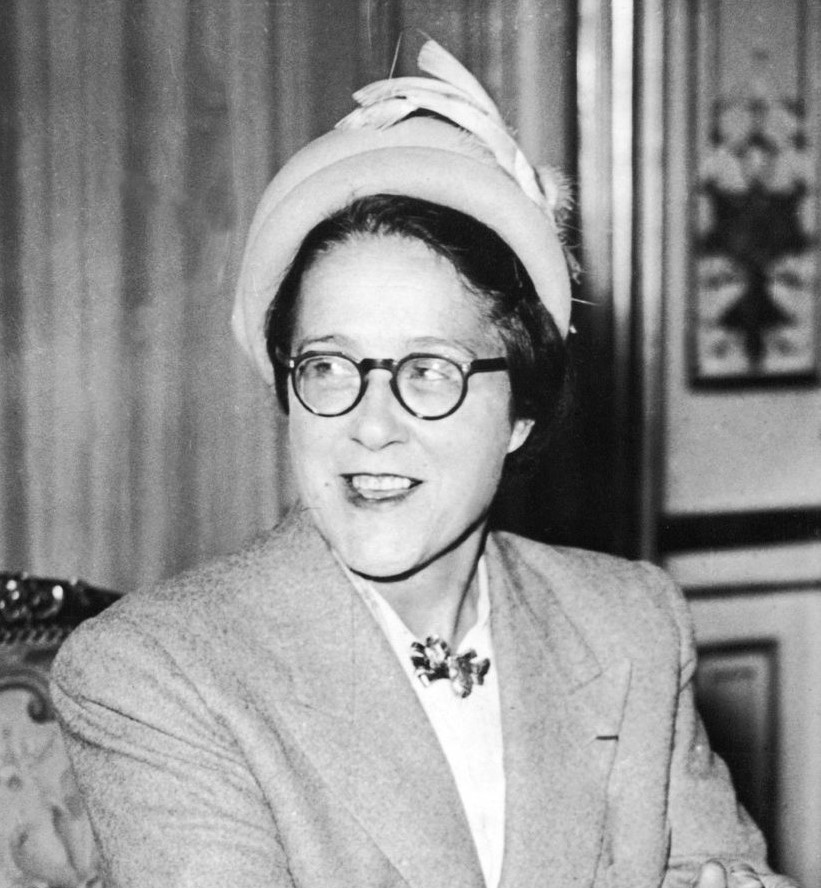
Germaine Poinso-Chapuis, Vice-President of the National Assembly of France from 1949 to 1951 and Minister of Health of France from 1947 to 1948

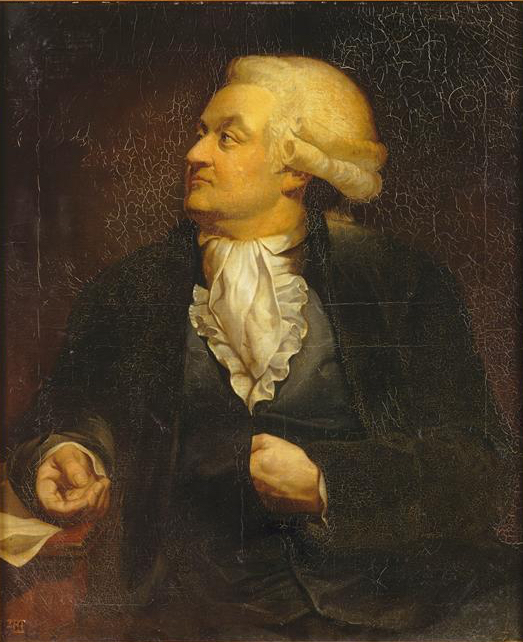
Honoré Gabriel Riqueti, comte de Mirabeau, President of the National Constituent Assembly of France from Jan to Feb 1791

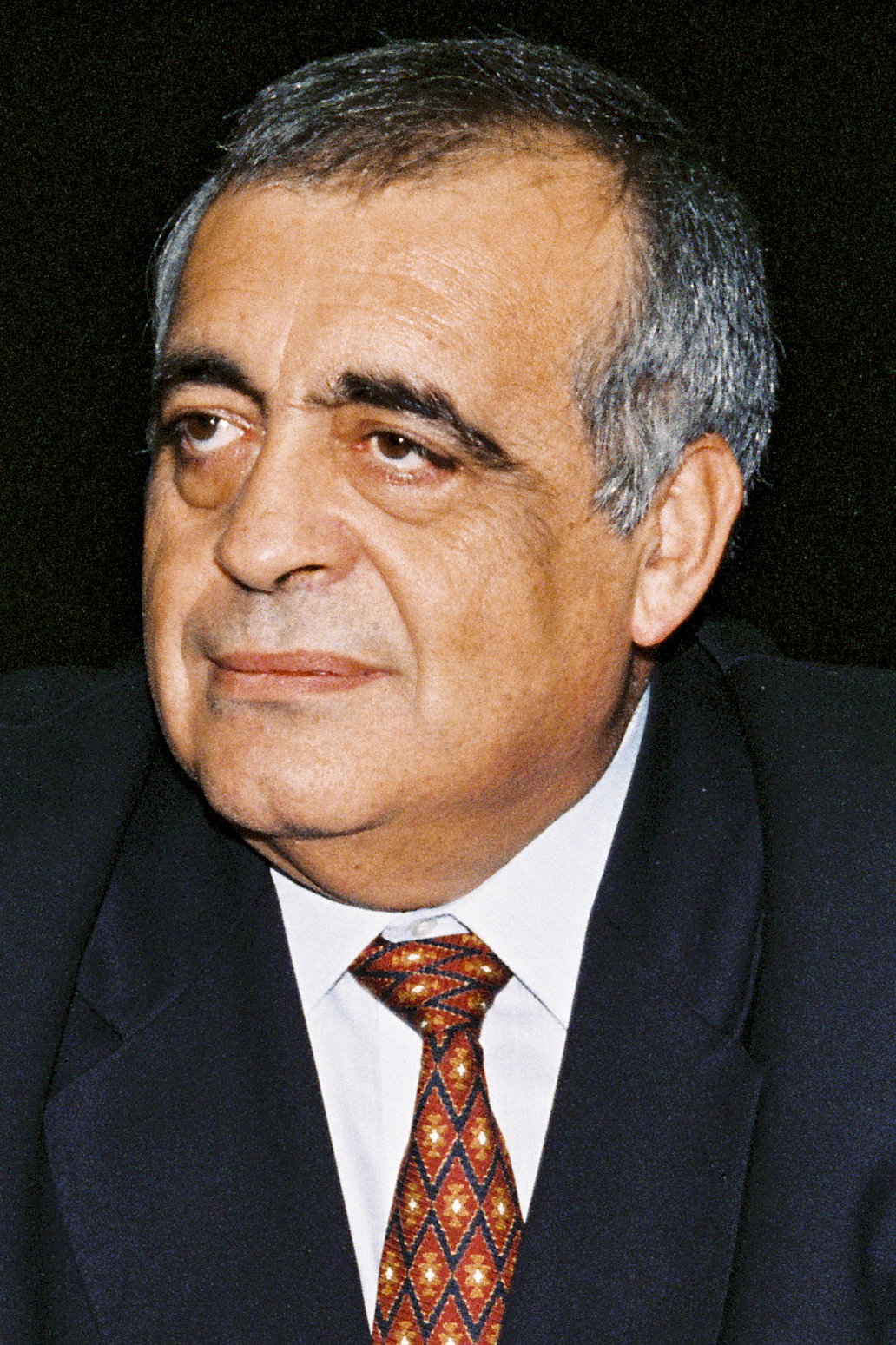
Philippe Séguin, President of the National Assembly of France from 1993 to 1997, Vice-President from 1981 to 1986, Minister of Labour of France from 1986 to 1988, and First President of the Court of Audit of France from 2004 to 2010

- Bérangère Abba – Deputy: 2017–2020/Jun 2022
- Henri Aiguier – Deputy: 1919–1924
- Fabien Albertin – Deputy: 1928–1940
- Alexandre Allegret-Pilot – Deputy: 2024–present
- Franck Allisio – Deputy: 2022–present
- Henri Amat – Deputy: 1871–1876/1878–1881
- Étienne Antonelli – Deputy: 1924–1932
- Emmanuel Arène – Deputy: 1881–1885/1886–1889/1889–1893/1893–1898/1898–1902/1902–1904; Senator: 1904–1908
- Avi Assouly – Deputy: 2012–2014
- Olivier Audibert-Troin – Deputy: 2012–2017
- Charles Jean Marie Barbaroux – Deputy: 1792–1794
- Charles Ogé Barbaroux – Deputy: 1849–1851; Senator: 1858–1867
- Gabriel Baron – Deputy: 1897–1898/1902–1906/1906–1910; Mayor of Aix-en-Provence: 1896–1897
- Jean-Pierre Bechter – Deputy: 1978–1981/1986–1988
- Joseph Elzéar Dominique Bernardi – Deputy: Apr–Sep 1797
- François Blain – Deputy: Apr–Sep 1797
- Adéodat Boissard – Deputy: 1919–1924
- Alfred Borriglione – Deputy: 1876–1894; Senator: 1894–1902
- Auguste Bouge – Deputy: 1889–1898/1910–1919
- Calixte Bournat – Deputy: 1863–1870
- Jean-Baptiste Bouteille – Deputy: 1876–1885; Senator: 1885–1893
- Xavier Bouquet – Deputy: 1876–1881
- Valérie Boyer – Deputy: 2007–2012/2012–2017/2017–2020; Senator: 2020–present
- Marine Brenier – Deputy: 2016–2022
- Albert Castelnau – Deputy: 1871–1876/1876–1877
- Raymond Cayol – Deputy: 1946–1951
- Pascal Ceccaldi – Deputy: 1906–1918
- André Cellard – Deputy: 1978–1981
- Émilie Chalas – Deputy: 2017–2022
- Jules Charles-Roux – Deputy: 1889–1898
- Jean-David Ciot – Deputy: 2012–2017
- Alexandre Clapier – Deputy: 1846–1848/1871–1876
- Daniel Colin – Deputy: 1986–1997
- Paul-André Colombani – Deputy: 2017–2022/2022–2024
- Charles Colonna d'Anfriani – Deputy: 1958–1962
- Jean-Michel Couve – Deputy: 1988–1993/1993–1997/1997–2002/2002–2007/2007–2012/2012–2017; Mayor of Saint-Tropez: 1983–1989/1993–2008
- André Daher – Deputy: 1936–1942
- Olivier Darrason – Deputy: 1993–1997
- Hendrik Davi – Deputy: 2022–present
- Gustave Delestrac – Deputy: 1898–1902
- Claude Delorme – Deputy: 1962–1978
- Alfred Donadei – Deputy: 1906–1914; Senator: 1929–1933
- Jean Dufour – Deputy: 2001–2002
- Philippe Dunoyer – Deputy: 2017–2022/2022–2024
- Pierre-Toussaint Durand de Maillane – Deputy: 1789–1791/1792–1795
- M'jid El Guerrab – Deputy: 2017–2022
- Toussaint-Bernard Émeric-David – Deputy: 1809–1815; Mayor of Aix-en-Provence: 1790–1791
- Joseph Floret – Deputy: 1842–1846
- Gustave Fourment – Deputy: 1910–1919; Senator: 1920–1940
- Toussaint Franchi – Deputy: 1939–1942
- Thadée Gabrielli – Deputy: 1902–1906
- Sauveur Gandolfi-Scheit – Deputy: 2007–2012/2012–2017
- Roger Garaudy – Deputy: 1945–1951/1956–1958; Senator: 1959–1962
- Alphonse Gent – Deputy: 1848–1849/1871–1877/1878–1882; Senator: 1882–1894
- Bruno Gilles – Deputy: 2002–2007; Senator: 2008–2020
- Hubert Giraud – Deputy: 1919–1924
- Élisabeth Guigou – Vice-President of the National Assembly of France: 2010–2011; Deputy: Jun–Jul 1997/2002–2012/2012–2017; MEP: 1994–1997; Minister of Justice of France: 1997–2000; Minister of Labour of France: 2000–2002
- René Hostache – Deputy: 1958–1962
- Antoine Pierre Jaubert – Deputy: 1802–1808
- Victor Jean – Deputy: 1919–1928
- André Joseph Jourdan – Deputy: 1795–1797
- Sébastien Jumel – Deputy: 2017–2022/2022–2024
- Max Juvénal – Deputy: 1945–1946/1956–1958
- Bertrand Kern – Deputy: 1998–2002
- Christian Kert – Deputy: 1988–1993/1993–1997/1997–2002/2002–2007/2007–2012/2012–2017
- Gustave de Laboulie – Deputy: 1834–1837/1848–1851
- Mohamed Laqhila – Deputy: 2017–2022/2022–2024
- Francis Leenhardt – Deputy: 1945–1962/1973–1978
- Jean Leonetti – Deputy: 1997–2011/2012–2017
- Victor Leydet – Deputy: 1881–1897; Senator: 1897–1908
- Alexandra Louis – Deputy: 2017–2022
- Arthur Malausséna – Deputy: 1892–1893/1894–1898
- Richard Mallié – Deputy: 2002–2007/2007–2012
- Daniel Mandon – Deputy: 1993–1997
- Charles Marchal – Deputy: 1898–1902
- Christophe Masse – Deputy: 2002–2007
- Mathieu Mauche – Deputy: 1791–1792
- Antoine Maure – Deputy: 1902–1906
- Patrick Mennucci – Deputy: 2012–2017
- Isidore Méritan – Deputy: 1919–1924
- Henri Michel – Deputy: 1898–1910/1924–1928; Senator: 1910–1921
- Paul François Morucci – Deputy: 1919–1924
- Louis Natoire – Deputy: 1798–1799
- Patrick Ollier – President of the National Assembly of France: Mar–Jun 2007; Vice-President of the National Assembly of France: 1998–2002; Deputy: 1988–2002/2002–2010/2012–2017
- Jean-Baptiste Pally – Deputy: 1885–1888
- Louis Jean Pascal – Deputy: 1848–1849
- Pierre Pascallon – Deputy: 1986–1988/1993–1997
- Claude-Emmanuel de Pastoret – President of the National Legislative Assembly of France: Oct 1791; President of the Council of Five Hundred: Aug–Sep 1796; Deputy: 1791–1792/1795–1797; President of the Senate of France/Chancellor of France: 1829–1830
- Henri Pellicot – Deputy: 1791–1792
- Marc Pena – Deputy: 2024–present
- Rodolphe Pesce – Deputy: 1978–1988
- Michel Pezet – Deputy: 1986–1988/1988–1993
- Pierre Marie Pietri – Deputy: 1848–1849; Senator: 1857–1864
- Germaine Poinso-Chapuis – Vice-President of the National Assembly of France: 1949–1951; Deputy: 1945–1955; Minister of Health of France: 1947–1948
- Brune Poirson – Deputy: Jun–Jul 2017/2020–2021
- Jean Joseph François Poujoulat – Deputy: 1849–1851
- Patrice Prat – Deputy: 2012–2017
- Louis Puy – Deputy: 1951–1958
- Joseph André Raybaud – Deputy: 1834–1839
- François Juste Marie Raynouard – Deputy: 1805–1814/1814–1815
- Joseph-Louis Régis – Deputy: 1924–1932
- Bernard Remacle – Deputy: 1852–1855
- Simon Renucci – Deputy: 2002–2007/2007–2012
- Joseph-François Reste – Deputy: 1945–1946
- René Ribière – Deputy: 1958–1962/1967–1978
- Jean-Baptiste Ripert – Deputy: 1902–1906
- Honoré Gabriel Riqueti, comte de Mirabeau – President of the National Constituent Assembly of France: Jan–Feb 1791; Deputy: 1789–1791
- Didier Robert – Deputy: 2007–2010; Senator: 2014–2017
- Laurianne Rossi – Deputy: 2017–2022
- Jean Roussel – Deputy: 1986–1988
- Philippe Séguin – President of the National Assembly of France: 1993–1997; Vice-President of the National Assembly of France: 1981–1986; Deputy: 1978–1986/1988–2002; First President of the Court of Audit of France: 2004–2010; Minister of Labour of France: 1986–1988
- Martial Sicard – Deputy: 1895–1902
- Marius Soustre – Deputy: 1881–1885; Senator: 1885–1897
- Alfred de Surian – Deputy: 1839–1846
- Jean Tardito – Deputy: 1988–1998
- André Thien Ah Koon – Deputy: 1986–2006
- Dominique Tian – Deputy: 2002–2007/2007–2012/2012–2017
- Xavier Vallat – Deputy: 1919–1924/1928–1940
- Souad Zitouni – Deputy: 2020–2022

=== Members of the Senate of France ===
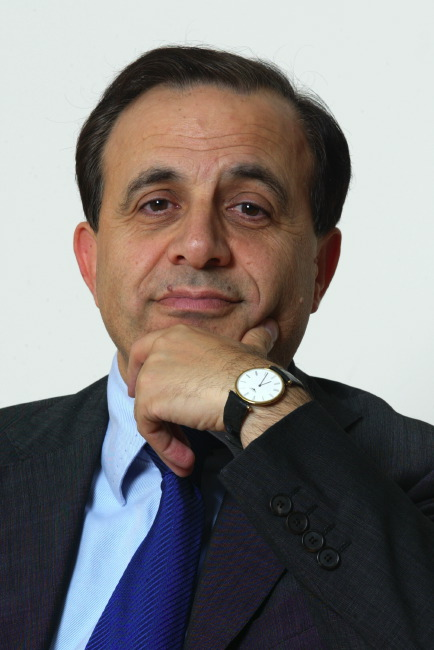
Roger Karoutchi, current First Vice-President of the Senate of France

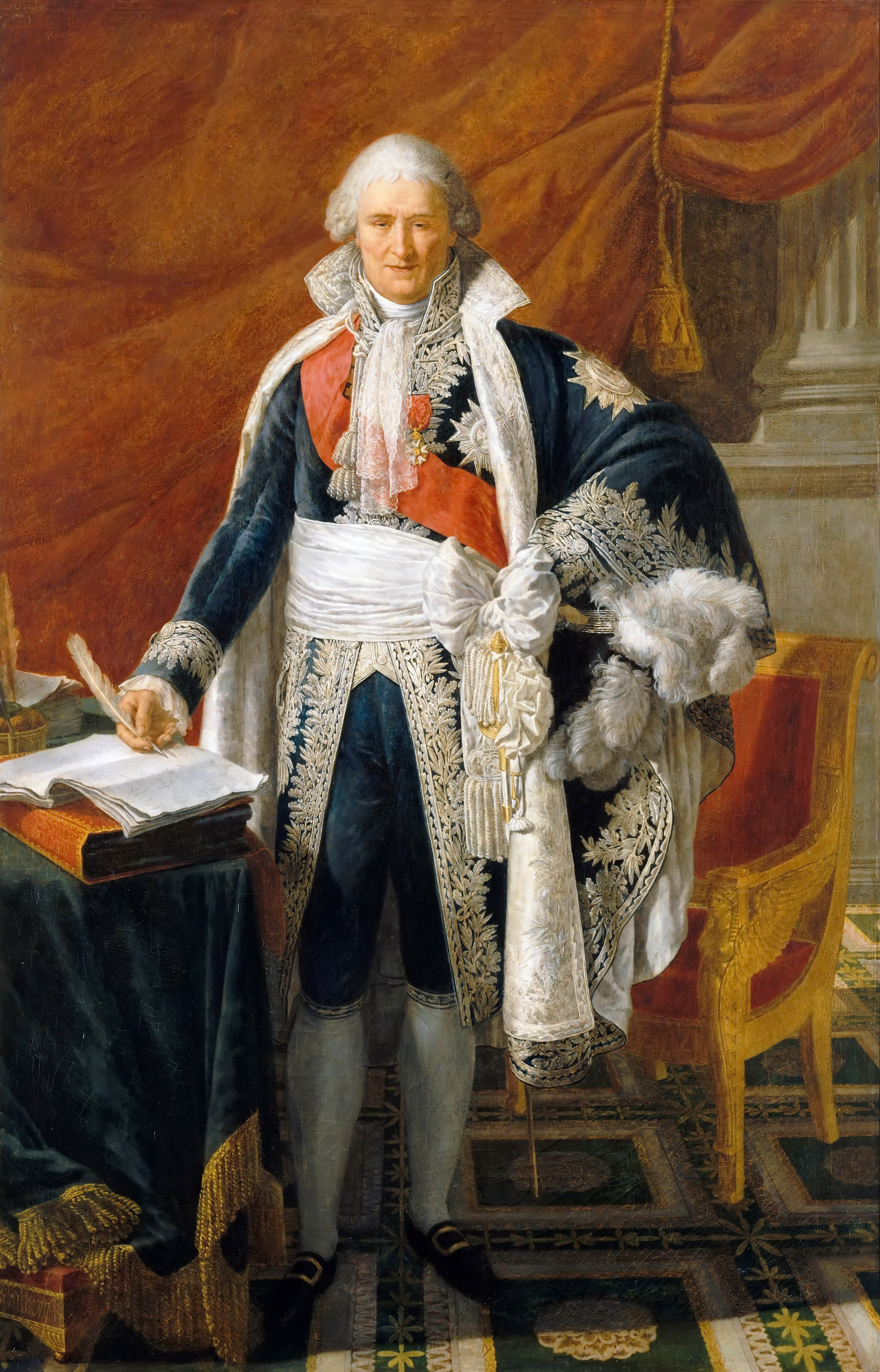
Jean-Étienne-Marie Portalis, President of the Senate of France from Jun to Jul 1796 and Minister of Worship of France from 1804 to 1807

- Félix Anglès – Senator: 1891–1897
- Henry Barne – Senator: 1879–1893
- Guy Benarroche – Senator: 2020–present
- Jean-Baptiste Blanc – Senator: 2020–present
- Charles Bonifay – Senator: 1980–1989
- Roger Carcassonne – Senator: 1959–1971
- Lionel Cherrier – Senator: 1974–1983
- Félix Ciccolini – Senator: 1971–1989
- Nassimah Dindar – Senator: 2017–2023
- Jean-Yves Dusserre – Senator: Oct–Dec 2014
- Vincent Farinole – Senator: 1894–1903
- Michel Fontaine – Senator: 2011–2017
- Jean Francou – Senator: 1971–1989
- Francis Giraud – Senator: 1998–2008
- Adrien Gouteyron – Senator: 1978–2011
- Louis Gros – Senator: 1948–1959/1959–1977; Member of the Constitutional Council of France: 1977–1984
- Pierre Amédée Jaubert – Peer: 1841–1847
- Sophie Joissains – Senator: 2008–2020
- Philippe Kaltenbach – Senator: 2011–2017
- Roger Karoutchi – First Vice-President of the Senate of France: 2020–2023/2026–present; Senator: 1999–2007/Jul 2009/2011–present; MEP: 1997–1999
- Michel Laugier – Senator: 2017–present
- Stéphane Le Rudulier – Senator: 2020–2026
- Émilien Lieutaud – Senator: 1948–1955
- Pierre Matraja – Senator: 1980–1989
- Jean-Étienne-Marie Portalis – President of the Senate of France: Jun–Jul 1796; Senator: 1795–1797; Minister of Worship of France: 1804–1807
- Richard Tuheiava – Senator: 2008–2014
- Robert Vigouroux – Senator: 1989–1998

=== Members of the European Parliament ===
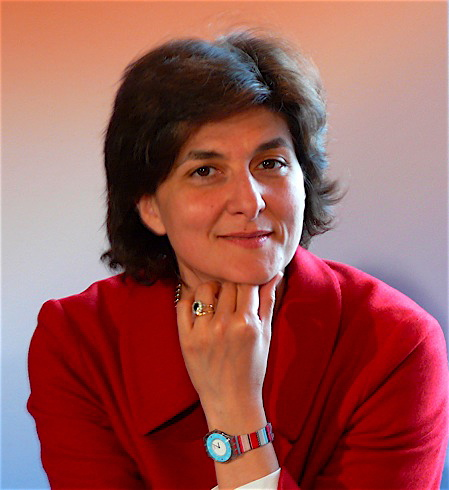
Sylvie Goulard, ex-MEP and former Minister of the Armed Forces of France

- Grégory Allione – MEP: 2024–present
- Mathilde Androuët – MEP: 2019–2024/2024–present
- Roland Blum – MEP: 1986–1989
- Marie-Arlette Carlotti – MEP: 1996–2009
- Gilbert Collard – MEP: 2019–2024
- Antoinette Fouque – MEP: 1994–1999
- Angéline Furet – MEP: 2024–present
- Sylvie Goulard – MEP: 2009–2017
- Jan Keller – MEP: 2014–2019
- Jean-Charles Marchiani – MEP: 1999–2004
- Joëlle Mélin – MEP: 2014–2022
- Margie Sudre – MEP: 1999–2009

== Diplomatic service ==
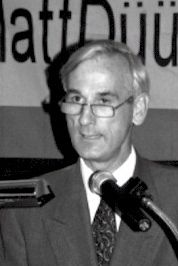
Jürgen Chrobog, German Ambassador to the United States from 1995 to 2001

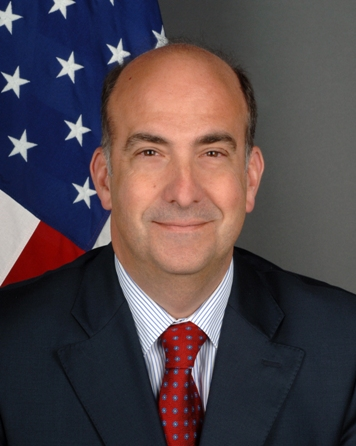
Kenneth H. Merten, U.S. Ambassador to Croatia from 2012 to 2015 and U.S. Ambassador to Bulgaria from 2023 to 2025

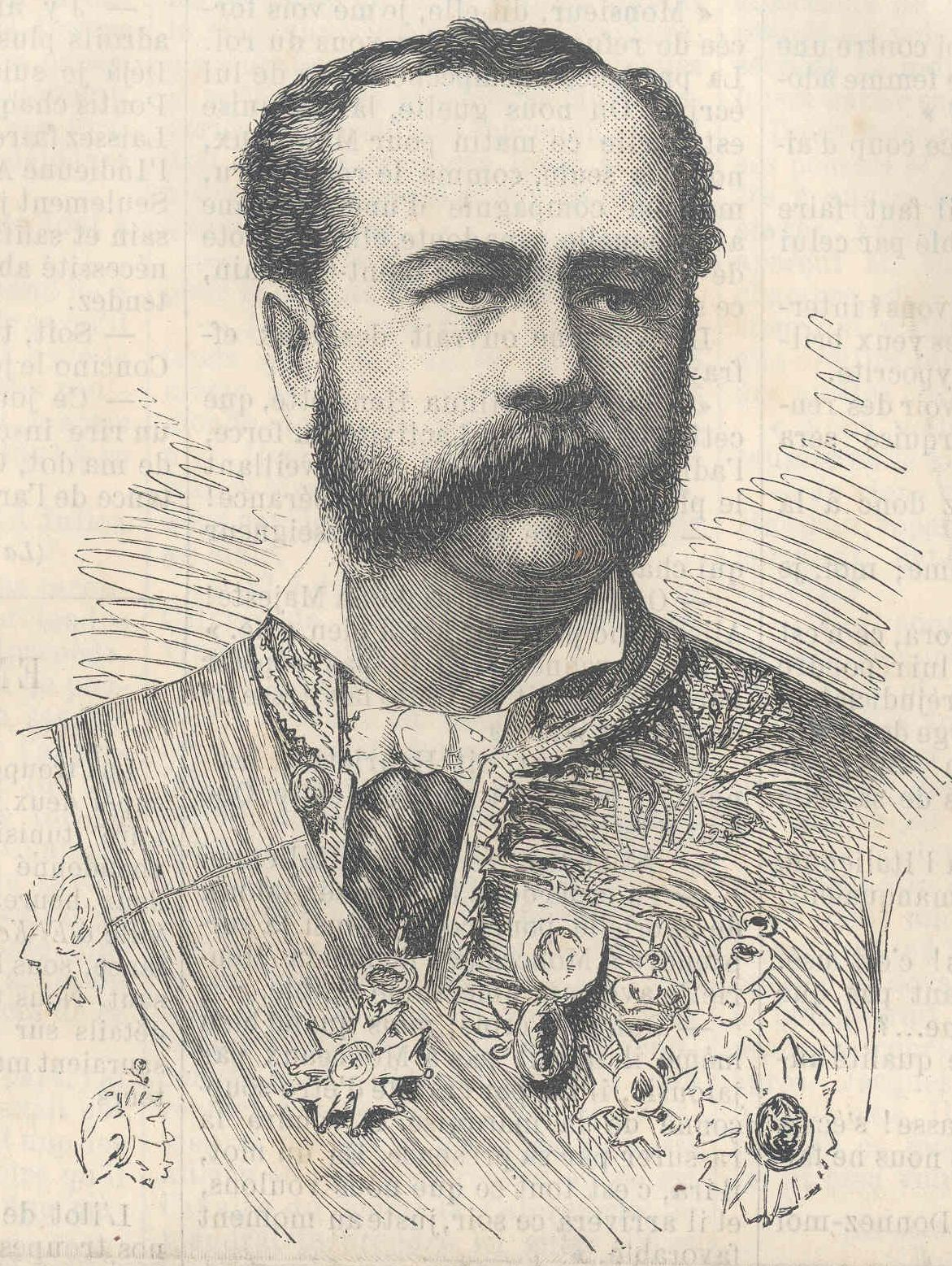
Théodore Roustan, French Ambassador to the United States from 1882 to 1891 and French Ambassador to Spain from 1891 to 1894

- Laurence Auer – French Ambassador to North Macedonia: 2012–2016; French Ambassador to Romania: 2020–2023; French Ambassador to Greece: 2023–present
- Félix de Beaujour – French Ambassador to the United States: 1804
- Alphonse Berns – Ambassador of Luxembourg to the United States: 1991–1998; Permanent Representative of Luxembourg to the United Nations (UN): 2002–2005; Ambassador of Luxembourg to Belgium: 2005–2011; Permanent Representative of Luxembourg to NATO: 2005–2011; Ambassador of Luxembourg to the UK: 2011–2013
- Emmanuel Bonne – French Ambassador to Lebanon: 2015–2017
- Krister Bringéus – Permanent Representative of Sweden to the OSCE: 2002–2006; Swedish Ambassador to Serbia and Montenegro: 2007–2010; Swedish Ambassador to Norway: 2018–2020
- Thomas Bruns – German Ambassador to Honduras: 2001–2005; German Ambassador to Brunei: 2008–2011; German Ambassador to Dominican Republic: 2011–2013
- Zouheir Chokr – Lebanese Ambassador to Qatar: 1994–1999
- Jürgen Chrobog – German Ambassador to the United States: 1995–2001
- Roland Eng – Cambodian Ambassador to the United States: 2000–2005
- Paul Faber – Ambassador of Luxembourg to Portugal: 1993–1998; Ambassador of Luxembourg to Italy: 1998–2002; Ambassador of Luxembourg to Austria: 2002–2005; Ambassador of Luxembourg to Switzerland: 2005–2007
- Francois Gordon – British Ambassador to Algeria: 1996–1999; British Ambassador to the Ivory Coast: 2001–2004; British High Commissioner to Uganda: 2005–2008
- Cherif Guellal – Algerian Ambassador to the United States: 1963–1967
- Paul Jean-Ortiz – French diplomat
- Rolf Kaiser – German Ambassador to the Republic of Cyprus: 2005–2008
- Kenneth H. Merten – United States Ambassador to Haiti: 2009–2012; United States Ambassador to Croatia: 2012–2015; United States Ambassador to Bulgaria: 2023–2025
- Alain de Muyser – Ambassador of Luxembourg to Portugal: 2004–2010; Ambassador of Luxembourg to Cape Verde: 2006–2010; Secretary General of the General Secretariat of the Benelux Union: 2020–2022
- Leslie E. Norton – Ambassador and Permanent Representative of Canada to the United Nations (UN) in Geneva and to the Conference on Disarmament (CD): 2019–present
- Dag Halvor Nylander – Norwegian diplomat
- Jean-Marie Paugam – French diplomat, Deputy Director-General of the World Trade Organization (WTO): 2021–present
- Christophe Penot – French Ambassador to Malaysia: 2014–2017; French Ambassador to Australia: 2017–2020
- Théodore Roustan – Residents-General in Tunisia: 1881–1882; French Ambassador to the United States: 1882–1891; French Ambassador to Spain: 1891–1894
- Walter Jürgen Schmid – German Ambassador to the Republic of Guinea: 1992–1994; German Ambassador to the Russian Federation: 2005–2010; German Ambassador to the Holy See: 2010–2011
- Moez Sinaoui – Tunisian Ambassador to Italy: 2016–2022
- Kurt Volker – United States Ambassador to NATO: 2008–2009
- Hubert Wurth – Ambassador of Luxembourg to the USSR, Poland, Finland and Mongolia, with residence in Moscow, USSR: 1988–1992; Ambassador of Luxembourg to the Netherlands: 1992–1998; Permanent Representative of Luxembourg to the OECD and UNESCO: 2003–2007; Ambassador of Luxembourg to the United Kingdom, Ireland and Iceland, with residence in London, UK: 2007–2011

== Lawyers, judges, and legal academics ==
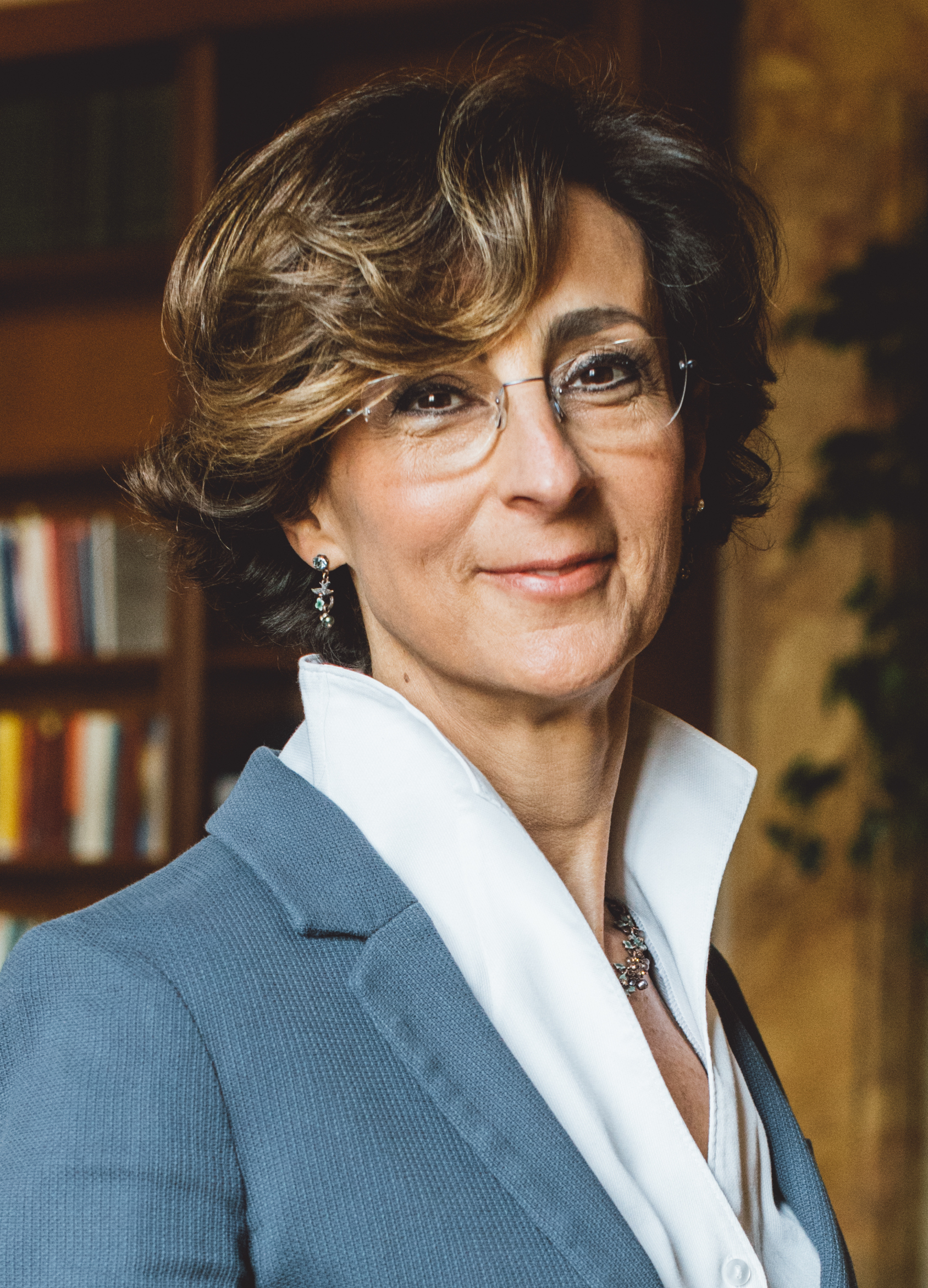
Marta Cartabia, President of the Constitutional Court of Italy from 2019 to 2020 and Minister of Justice of Italy from 2021 to 2022

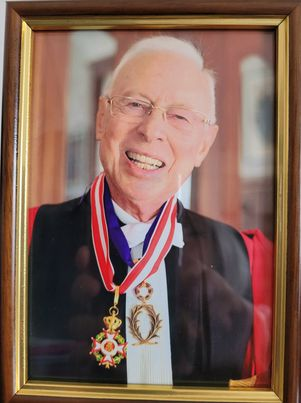
Hubert Charles, President of the Supreme Court of Monaco from 2007 to 2012

- Peter Annis – Judge of the Federal Court of Canada: 2013–present
- Gilbert Azibert – Procureur général at the Court of Appeal of Bordeaux: 2005–2008; Secretary General of the Ministry of Justice of France: 2008–2010; Avocat général at the Court of Cassation of France: 2010–2014
- Nicolas Battestini – President of the Court of Cassation of France: 1955–1963
- Henri Bernard – French lawyer and judge, who was one of the judges of the International Military Tribunal for the Far East (IMTFE)
- Anne Bouillon – French lawyer, who was named as one of the most powerful lawyers in France in 2019 by GQ
- Marta Cartabia – President of the Constitutional Court of Italy: 2019–2020; Minister of Justice of Italy: 2021–2022
- Julien Chaisse – professor of law at the City University of Hong Kong
- Suzanne Challe – First President of the Court of Appeal of Nîmes: 1978–1991
- Hubert Charles – President of the Supreme Court of Monaco: 2007–2012
- Gaston Crémieux – French lawyer, journalist and writer
- Mircea Criste – Prosecutor General of Romania: 1998–2001
- Albin Curet – First President of the Court of Appeal of Chambéry: 1906–1912; Adviser to the Court of Cassation of France: 1912–1919
- Charles Debbasch – French academic and jurist
- Tony Downes – former Deputy Vice-Chancellor and professor of law of the University of Reading
- Kimberly Marteau Emerson – American attorney, advocate and civic leader
- Myriam Ezratty – Director of the Prison Administration Directorate: 1983–1986; First President of the Court of Appeal of Paris: 1988–1996
- Charles Annibal Fabrot – French jurisconsult
- Jean-Pierre Gibert – French canon lawyer
- Claude Jorda – Procureur général at the Court of Appeal of Bordeaux: 1985–1992; Procureur général at the Court of Appeal of Paris: 1992–1994; Judge/President of the International Criminal Tribunal for the former Yugoslavia (ICTY): 1994–2003/1999–2002; Judge at the International Criminal Court (ICC): 2003–2007
- Marie-Madeleine Mborantsuo – President of the Constitutional Court of Gabon: 1991–2023
- Iulia Motoc – Judge of the Constitutional Court of Romania: 2010–2013; Judge of the European Court of Human Rights (ECtHR): 2013–2023; Judge of the International Criminal Court (ICC): 2024–present
- Grégoire Mourre – President of the First Civil Division of the Court of Cassation of France: 1811–1815; Chief Prosecutor of the Court of Cassation of France: 1815–1830
- Amina Mousso – Vice-President of the Supreme Court of Burkina Faso: 1996–2002
- Mame Bassine Niang – first female lawyer in Senegal
- Joseph Louis Elzéar Ortolan – French jurist and former chair of Comparative Criminal Law at the University of Paris, Sorbonne
- Yves Rüedi – Judge of the Federal Supreme Court of Switzerland: 2014–present
- Louis Sarrut – President of the Court of Cassation of France: 1917–1925
- Emmanuel Tawil – French lawyer and academic, senior lecturer in Public law at the Paris-Panthéon-Assas University
- Colin Tyre, Lord Tyre – Scottish lawyer, former President of the Council of Bars and Law Societies of Europe, and a Senator of the College of Justice, a judge of the Supreme Courts of Scotland
- Albert Jan van den Berg – the Arbitration Chair at Erasmus University Rotterdam and the president of the Netherlands Arbitration Institute
- Prosper Weil – French lawyer, professor emeritus at the Paris-Panthéon-Assas University, member of the Académie des Sciences Morales et Politiques
- Juliette Smaja Zérah – first female lawyer in Tunisia

== Arts, literature, humanities, and entertainment ==
=== Entertainment ===
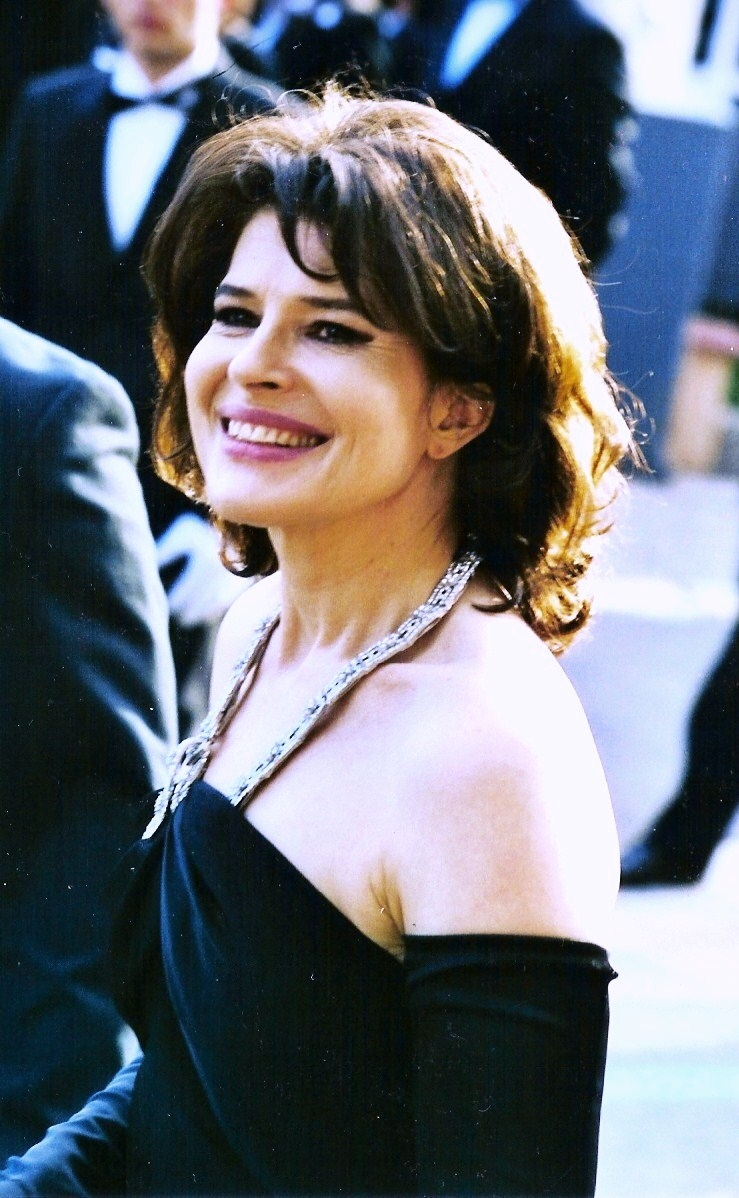
Fanny Ardant, winner of the 1997 César Award for Best Actress

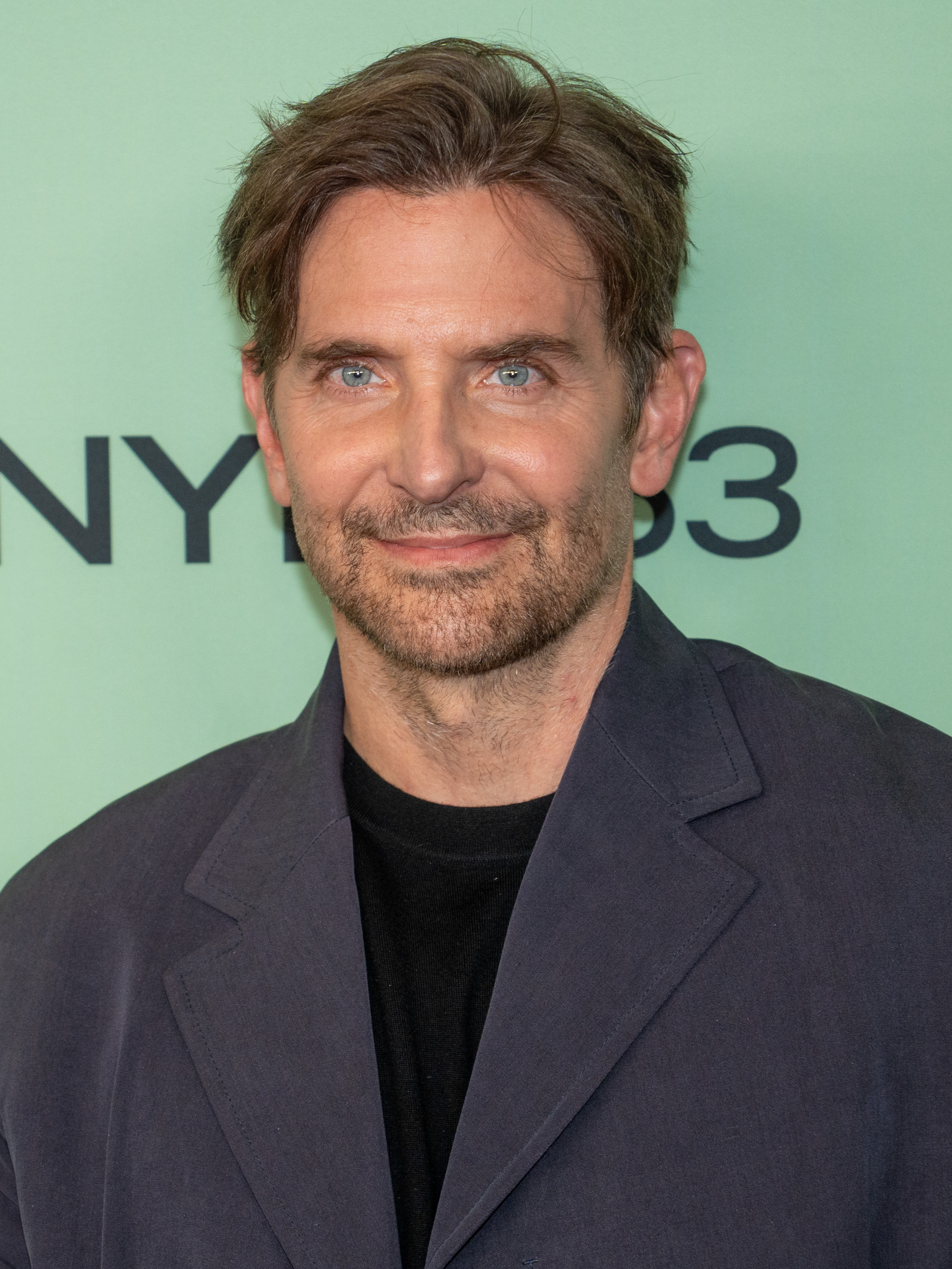
Bradley Cooper, winner of a BAFTA, three Grammy Awards, and twelve-time Academy Award nominee

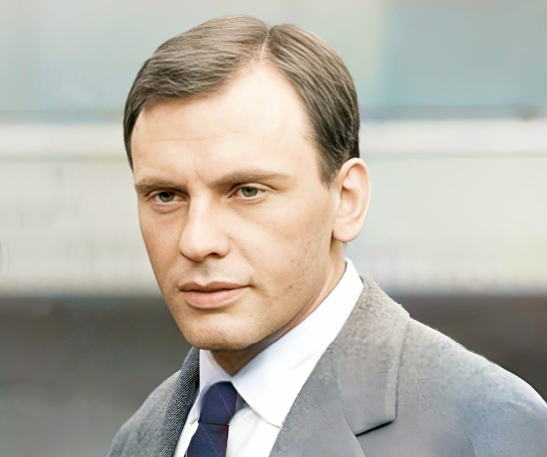
Jean-Louis Trintignant, winner of the Best Actor Award at the 1969 Cannes Film Festival and the 2013 César Award for Best Actor

- Marie Albe – French actress and journalist
- Kiarash Anvari – Iranian film director, video artist, and scriptwriter
- Fanny Ardant – French actress, winner of the 1997 César Award for Best Actress
- Ariane Ascaride – French actress, winner of the 1998 César Award for Best Actress
- Ishmael Bernal – Filipino film, stage and television director
- Robin Campillo – French screenwriter, editor and film director
- Bradley Cooper – American actor and film producer, winner of a BAFTA, three Grammy Awards, and twelve-time Academy Award nominee
- Philippe Faucon – French film director, screenwriter and producer, winner of the 2016 César Awards for Best Film and Best Adaptation
- Nicole Ferroni – French actress
- Jacques Fieschi – French screenwriter, winner of the 2022 César Award for Best Adaptation
- Sadaf Foroughi – Iranian film maker, video artist and film editor
- Robert Guédiguian – French film director, actor, screenwriter and producer
- Ken Hom – Chinese American chef, author and British television-show presenter
- Caroline Huppert – French film director and screenwriter, the sister of actress Isabelle Huppert
- Cyprien Iov – French comedian, actor and YouTuber
- Mylène Jampanoï – French actress
- Jean Josipovici – French screenwriter and film director
- Ariane Labed – French actress, who was awarded the Coppa Volpi for the Best Actress at the 67th Venice International Film Festival
- Xavier Laurent – French actor
- Richard Marquand – Welsh film and television director
- Paul Meurisse – French actor
- Elisa Miller – Mexican film director, writer, and producer, winner of the Short Film Palme d'Or at the 2007 Cannes Film Festival
- Grégory Montel – French actor
- Marcel Pagnol – French novelist, playwright, filmmaker, and recipient of the Honorary César award, who became the first filmmaker elected to the Académie Française
- Kleofina Pnishi – Kosovar-born French actress and model
- Alice Pol – French actress
- Jean Renoir – French film director, recipient of the Academy Honorary Award, and son of the Impressionist painter Pierre-Auguste Renoir
- Richard Sammel – German actor
- Rebecca Scroggs – English actress
- Corinne Touzet – French actress
- Jean-Louis Trintignant – French actor, winner of the Best Actor Award at the 1969 Cannes Film Festival and the 2013 César Award for Best Actor

=== Historians ===
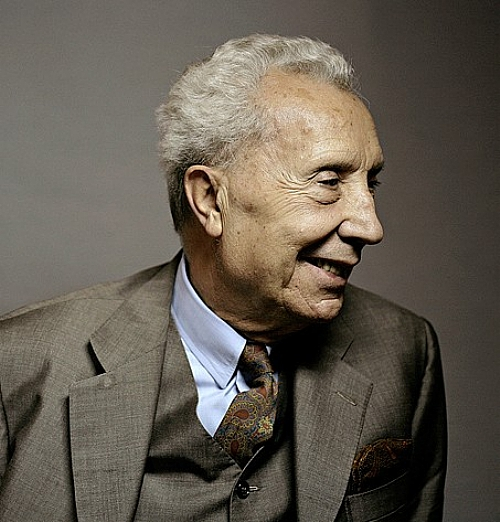
Marc Fumaroli, French historian, former member of the French Academy, the Academy of Inscriptions and Belles-Lettres, and a foreign member of the British Academy

- Xavier Accart – French historian of ideas, specializing in René Guénon
- Martin Aurell – Spanish-French historian and academic, specializing in the House of Plantagenet
- Patrice Bret – French historian of science and technology
- Noël Coulet – French academic and medieval historian
- Karima Dirèche – French Algerian historian specialising in the contemporary history of the Maghreb
- Edhem Eldem – Turkish historian, author and academic
- Marc Fumaroli – French historian and essayist, member of the French Academy, the Academy of Inscriptions and Belles-Lettres, and a foreign member of the British Academy
- Hubert Gerbeau – French historian and writer, Knight of the Legion of Honour
- Emile Haag – Luxembourgish historian, trade unionist and former principal of the Athénée de Luxembourg
- Alexander Korb – German historian
- Bernard Lugan – French historian and associate professor of African history at Jean Moulin University Lyon 3
- André Michel – French art historian, member of the Académie des Beaux-Arts, Knight of the Legion of Honour
- Antoine Pagi – French ecclesiastical historian
- Régine Pernoud – French historian and medievalist
- Karin Priester – German historian and political scientist
- Ambroise Roux-Alphéran – French historian
- Maya Shatzmiller – Canadian historian specializing in the economic history of the Muslim world, Fellow of the Royal Society of Canada
- Abdeljelil Temimi – Tunisian historian
- Matthias Theodor Vogt – German historian and musicologist

=== Journalism ===
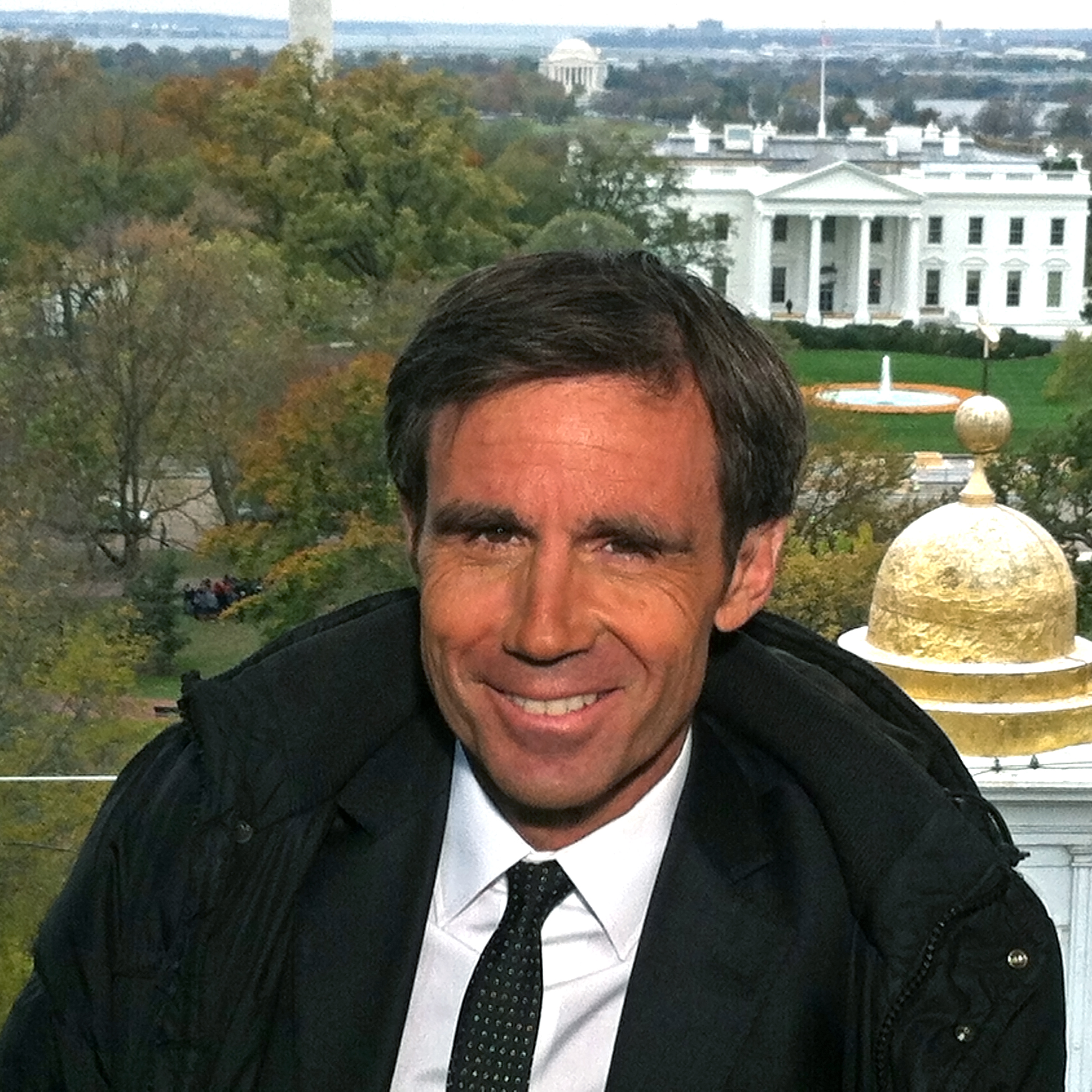
David Pujadas, French journalist and television presenter

- Melanie Amann – German journalist, deputy editor-in-chief of Der Spiegel
- Ali Bach Hamba – Tunisian journalist
- François Beaudonnet – French television and radio journalist
- Julien Benedetto – French journalist
- François Chalais – French reporter, journalist, writer and film historian
- Úna Claffey – Irish journalist and political adviser
- Camille Combal – French television and radio presenter
- Hervé Gattegno – French investigative journalist
- Gérard Grizbec – French television and radio journalist
- Jim Hoagland – American journalist, an associate editor, senior foreign correspondent and columnist for The Washington Post, and two-time recipient of the Pulitzer Prize
- Sylvie Kauffmann – French journalist for Agence France-Presse (AFP) and the newspaper Le Monde
- Lutz Kleveman – German investigative journalist and photographer
- Maxence Layet – French science and technology journalist and author
- Geoffroy Lejeune – French journalist, the editor-in-chief of Valeurs actuelles
- Bernard Lions – French sports journalist
- Jean-Marc Morandini – French journalist
- Victor Morgan – American journalist, editor for The Akron Press, The Cincinnati Post and Cleveland Press; owner and editor of The Clearwater Sun, and editor-in-chief for the Scripps-Howard Newspapers
- Terry Phillips – American journalist, author and media consultant
- David Pujadas – French journalist and television presenter
- Yasmine Ryan – New Zealand print, television and multimedia journalist
- Raymond Saint-Pierre – Canadian journalist
- Sadri Skander – Tunisian TV presenter and producer, entrepreneur and editor-in-chief
- Paul Toupin – Quebec journalist, essayist and playwright
- Alba Ventura – French journalist

=== Literature ===
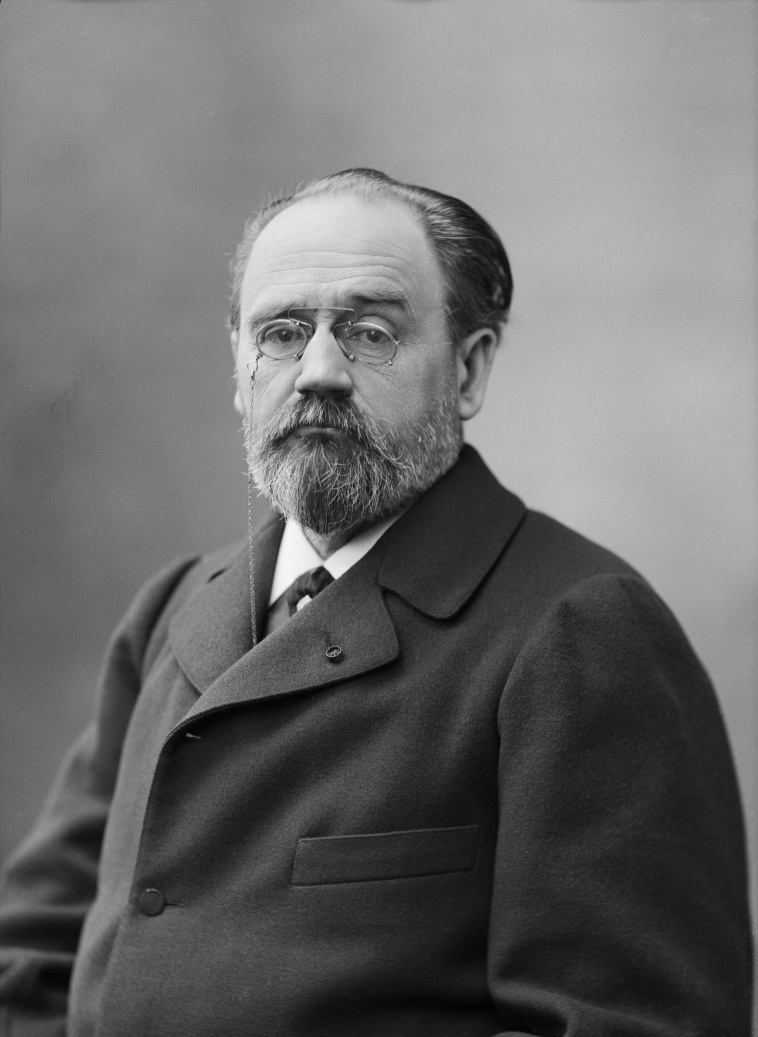
Émile Zola, French writer, two-time nominee for the Nobel Prize in Literature, in 1901 and 1902

- Chris Agee – Irish poet, essayist and editor
- Jean Aicard – French poet, dramatist and novelist, former member of the Académie Française and former President of the Société des gens de lettres de France (SGDLF)
- Paul Alexis – French novelist, dramatist and journalist
- Joseph d'Arbaud – French poet
- Christophe Arleston – French comics writer and editor
- Léon de Berluc-Pérussis – French poet and historian, former Majoral of the Félibrige
- Mongo Beti – Cameroonian writer
- Beverley Bie Brahic – American poet and translator
- Marcel Brion – French essayist, literary critic, novelist, historian, member of the Académie Française
- Ashley Bryan – American writer and illustrator of children's books, winner of the Laura Ingalls Wilder Award
- Marion May Campbell – Australian novelist and academic
- Efemia Chela – Zambian-Ghanaian writer, literary critic and editor
- Raphaël Confiant – French writer
- Ghislain de Diesbach – French writer and biographer
- Loup Durand – French crime writer
- Ferdinand Duviard – French writer and novelist
- Jean Echenoz – French writer
- Marian Engel – Canadian novelist
- Charles Exbrayat – French fiction writer
- José Frèches – French historical novelist
- Madeleine Gagnon – Quebec educator, literary critic and writer
- Romain Gary – French novelist, film director, diplomat and World War II aviator, the only author to have won the Prix Goncourt twice
- Joachim Gasquet – French author, poet, and art critic
- Sebhat Gebre-Egziabher – Ethiopian writer
- José Giovanni – French writer and film-maker
- Pétur Gunnarsson – Icelandic writer
- Malek Haddad – Algerian poet and writer
- William Kreiten – German literary critic and poet
- Pierre La Mure – French author
- Abdelwahab Meddeb – French-language writer and cultural critic, professor of comparative literature at Paris Nanterre University
- Denise Morel – French writer and psychiatrist
- Suzanne Prou – French novelist, winner of the 1973 Prix Renaudot
- André de Richaud – French poet and writer
- Yvon Rivard – Canadian writer
- Julie Ruocco – French writer
- Boris Schreiber – French writer
- Christiane Singer – French writer, essayist and novelist
- Neige Sinno – French novelist and memoirist, winner of the Prix Goncourt des Lycéens, the Prix Femina, and the Strega European Prize
- Olga Stanisławska – Polish writer
- Patrick Süskind – German writer and screenwriter
- Pierre Torreilles – French writer, poet and editor
- Bahaa Trabelsi – Moroccan novelist
- Ira Trivedi – Indian author, columnist, and yoga Acharya
- Ana Lydia Vega – Puerto Rican writer
- Manuel Veiga – Cape Verdean writer
- Keith Waldrop – American poet, writer and translator, professor emeritus at Brown University, winner of the 2009 National Book Award for Poetry
- Rosmarie Waldrop – American poet, translator and publisher
- Choe Yun – Korean writer, winner of the 1994 Yi Sang Literary Award
- Émile Zola – French novelist, journalist and playwright, who was nominated twice for the Nobel Prize in Literature

=== Music ===
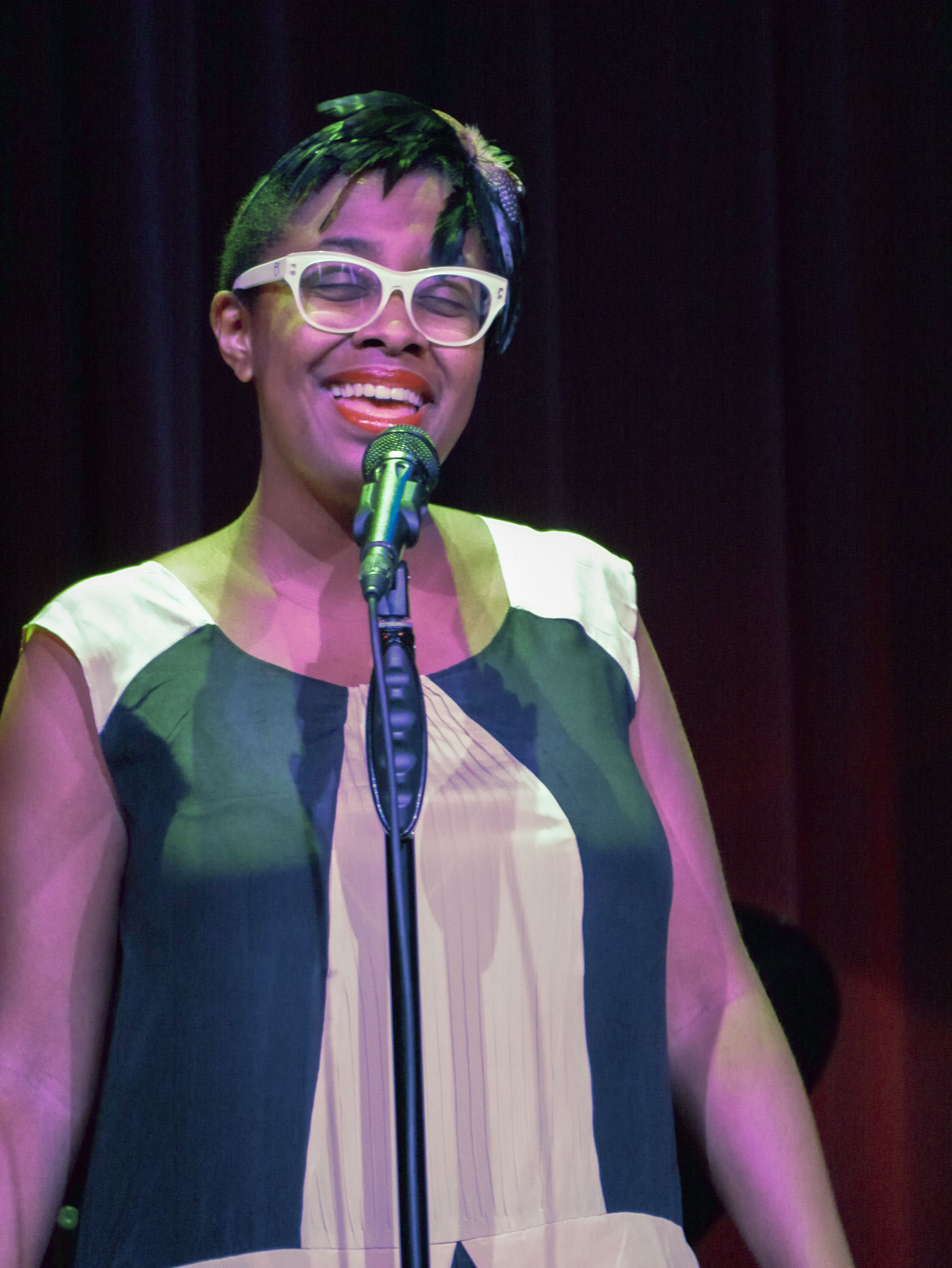
Cécile McLorin Salvant, three-time Grammy Award-winning jazz singer

- Thierry Amiel – French singer and songwriter
- Florent Atem – French Polynesian guitarist, six-time Grammy Award nominee
- Françoise Atlan – French singer
- Paul Bastide – French conductor and composer
- Philippe Blay – French musicologist
- Emmanuel Boyer de Fonscolombe – French composer
- Régis Campo – French composer, member of the Académie des Beaux-Arts
- Anaïs Croze – French singer
- Nick Drake – English musician and singer-songwriter
- Younes Elamine – Moroccan-French singer, songwriter, poet, and music producer
- Kungs – French DJ, record producer and musician
- Clara Luciani – French singer-songwriter and musician
- Darius Milhaud – French composer and conductor
- Francisco Negrin – award-winning stage director working in opera
- Joseph d'Ortigue – French musicologist and critic
- Henry Padovani – French musician, noted for being the original guitarist for the Police
- Mélanie Pain – French indie pop singer
- Pierre Pradier – French classical pianist
- Jean-Pierre Rampal – French flautist
- Cécile McLorin Salvant – three-time Grammy Award-winning jazz singer
- Nicolas Vatomanga – saxophonist, flutist, bandleader and composer

=== Visual arts ===
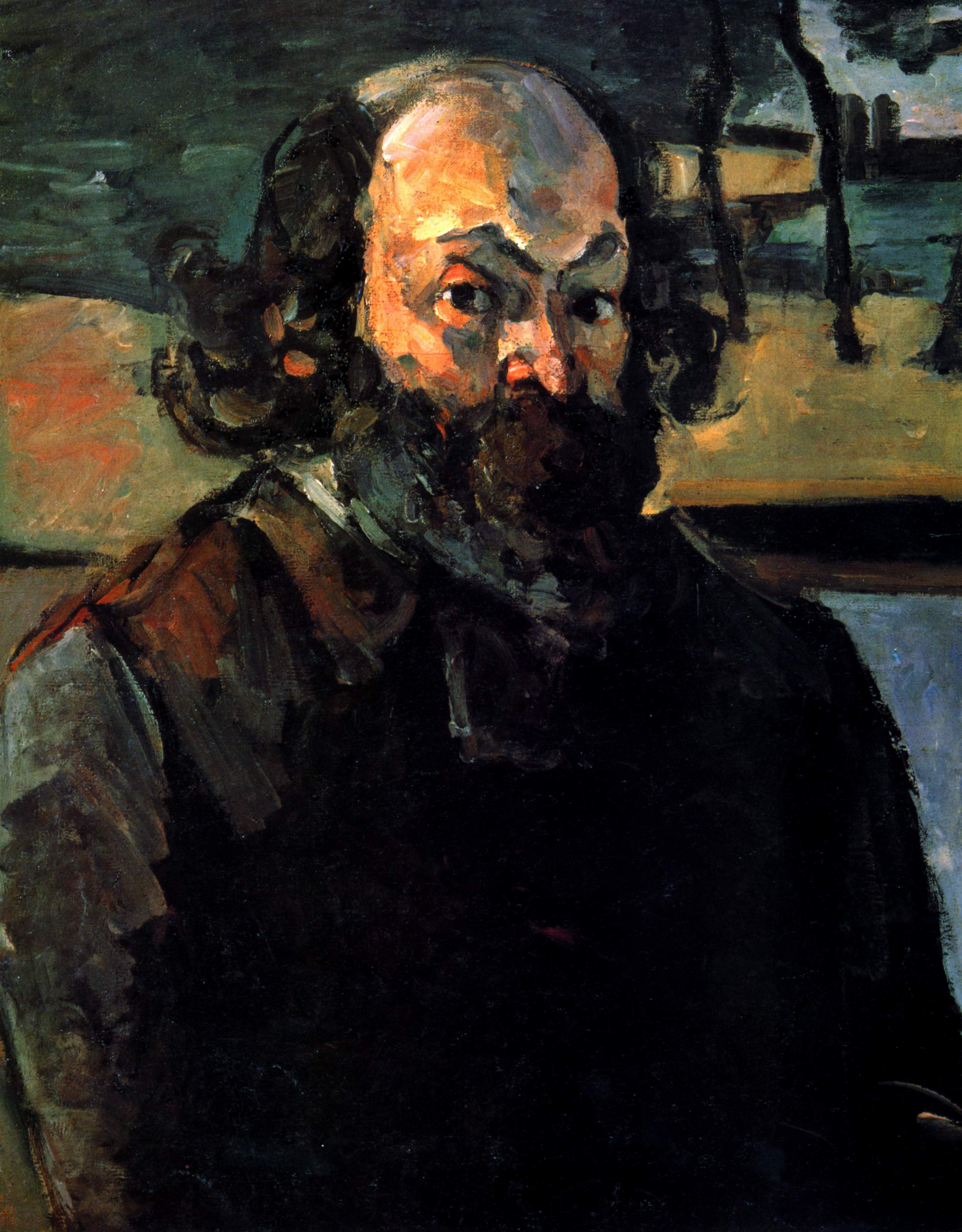
Paul Cézanne, French Post-Impressionist painter; a self-portrait created in c. 1875 and now on display at the Musée d'Orsay

- François Arnal – French painter and sculptor
- Gilles Barbier – French contemporary artist
- Paul Cézanne – French artist and Post-Impressionist painter
- Lucien Clergue – French photographer, former chairman of the Academy of Fine Arts
- Michel-François Dandré-Bardon – French history painter and etcher
- Roger Excoffon – French graphic designer
- Xiao Ge – Chinese artist and curator
- Phoebe Gloeckner – American cartoonist, illustrator, painter, and novelist
- Jeremy Houghton – British fine artist
- George Morrison – American landscape painter and sculptor
- Jean-François Pierre Peyron – French Neoclassical painter, printmaker, and art collector
- Odysseas Phokas – Greek painter, specialising in landscape painting
- Michael Reinhardt – American photographer whose images were featured in magazines such as Vogue, Harper's Bazaar and Sports Illustrated
- Reno Salvail – Canadian artist, photographer, and author
- Haim Steinbach – American artist
- Catherine Walker – French-born fashion designer, designer of Diana, Princess of Wales

== Scientists and academics ==
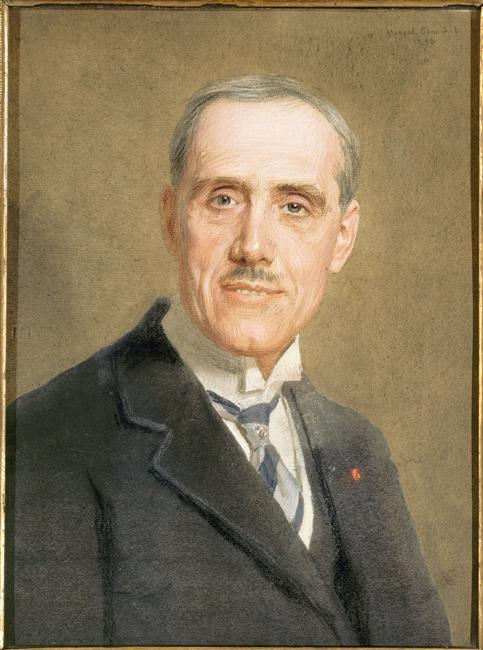
Maurice de Broglie, 6th Duke of Broglie, President of the French Academy of Sciences from Jan to Dec 1954 and Member of the French Academy from 1934 to 1960

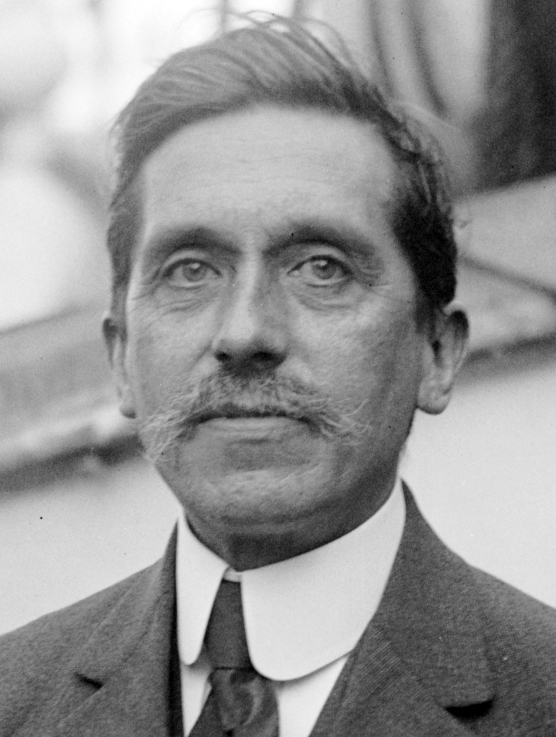
Charles Fabry, co-discoverer of the ozone layer, former member of the French Academy of Sciences and the British Royal Society

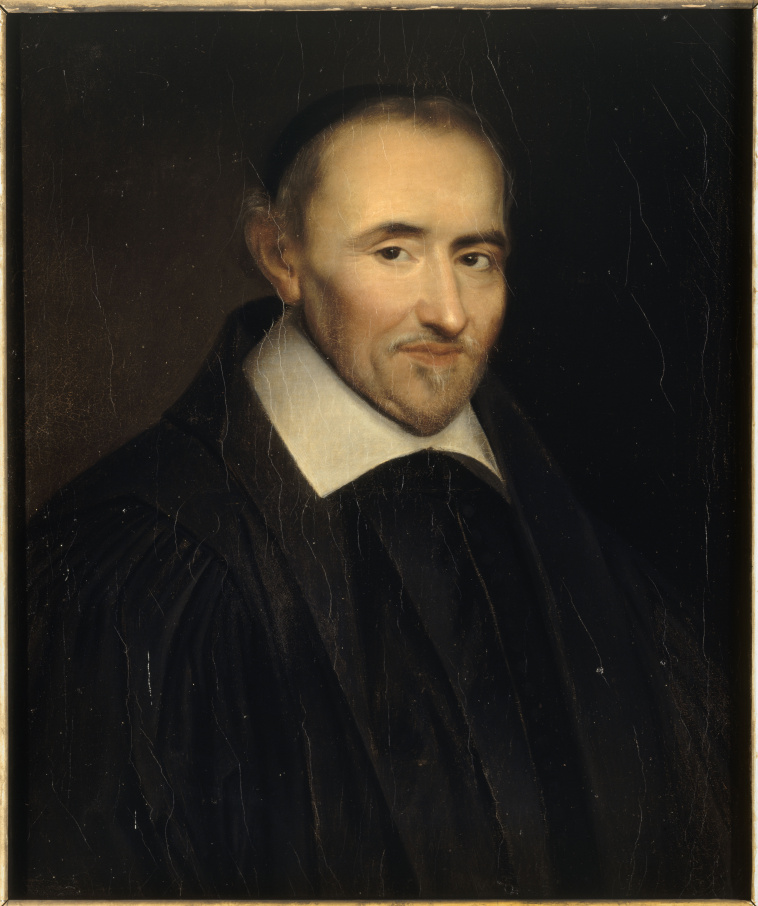
Pierre Gassendi, the first observer and author of the first data on the transit of Mercury, after whom the lunar impact crater Gassendi is named

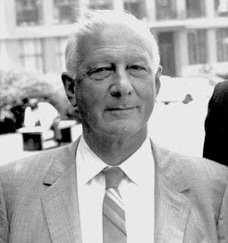
Antoine Marc Gaudin, Professor at MIT from 1939 to 1966 and founding member of the National Academy of Engineering (NAE)

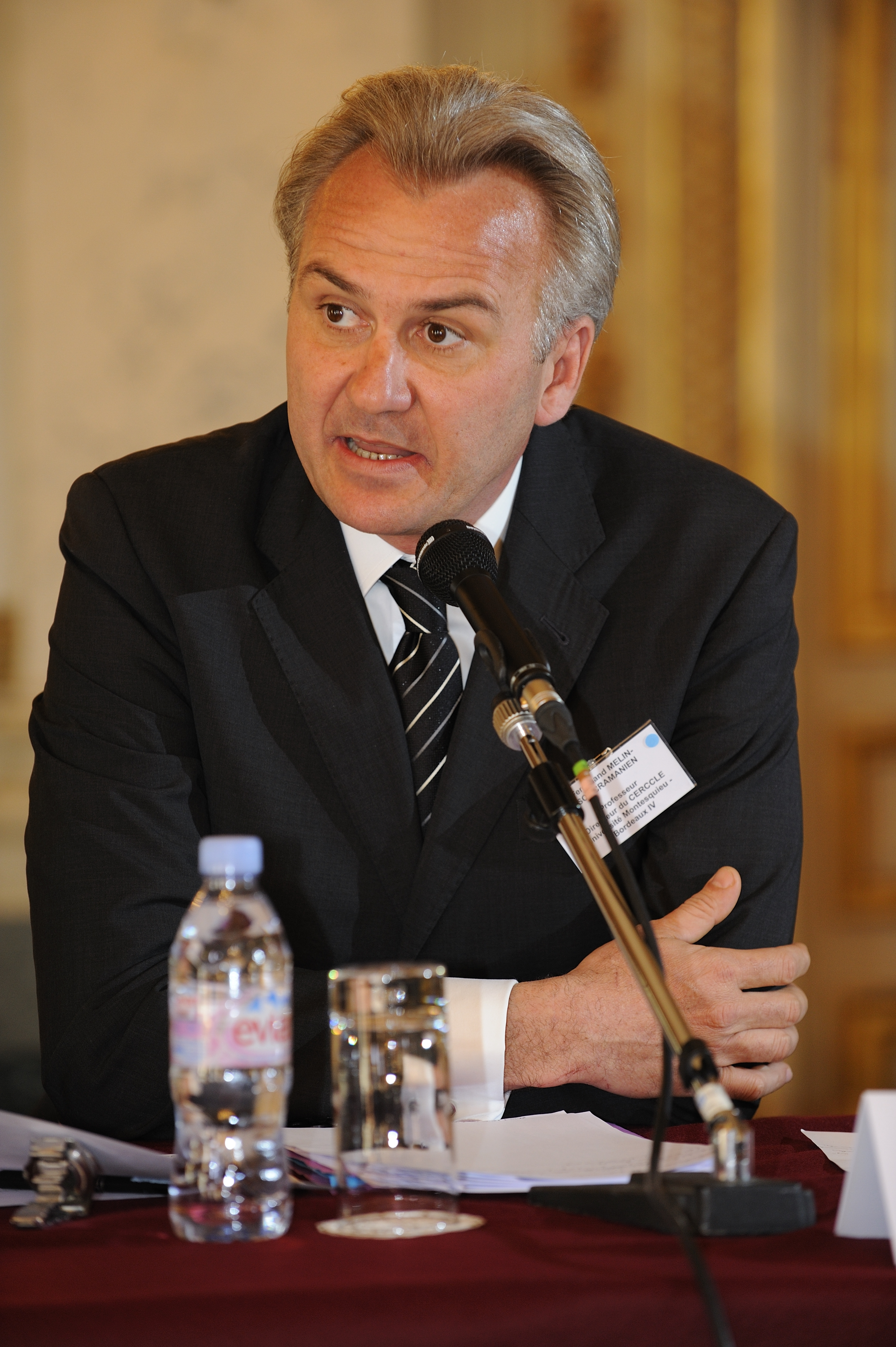
Ferdinand Mélin-Soucramanien, current President of the National Institute of Public Service (INSP)

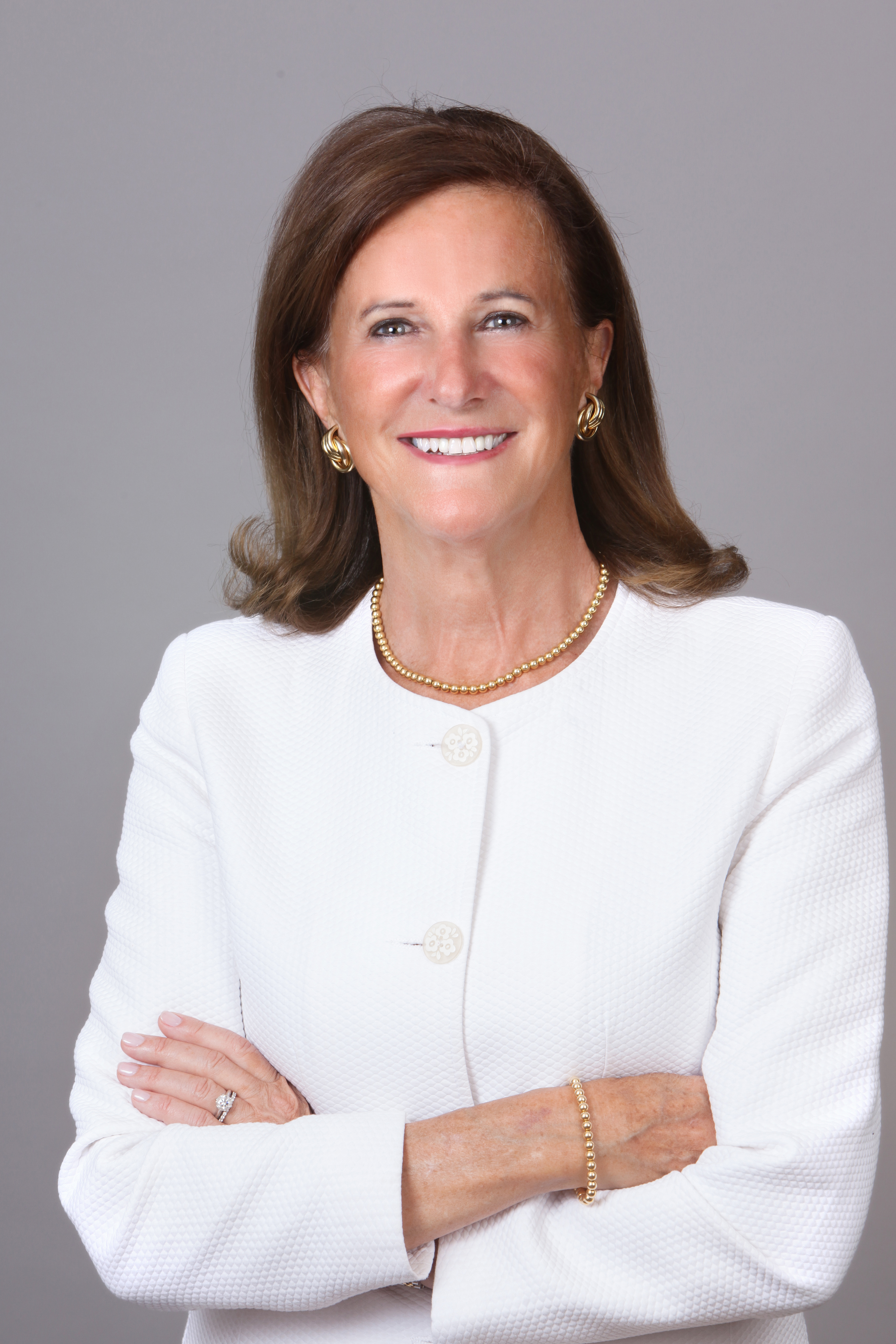
Elisabeth Pate-Cornell, Professor and Founding Chair of the Department of Management Science and Engineering at Stanford University from 2000 to 2011

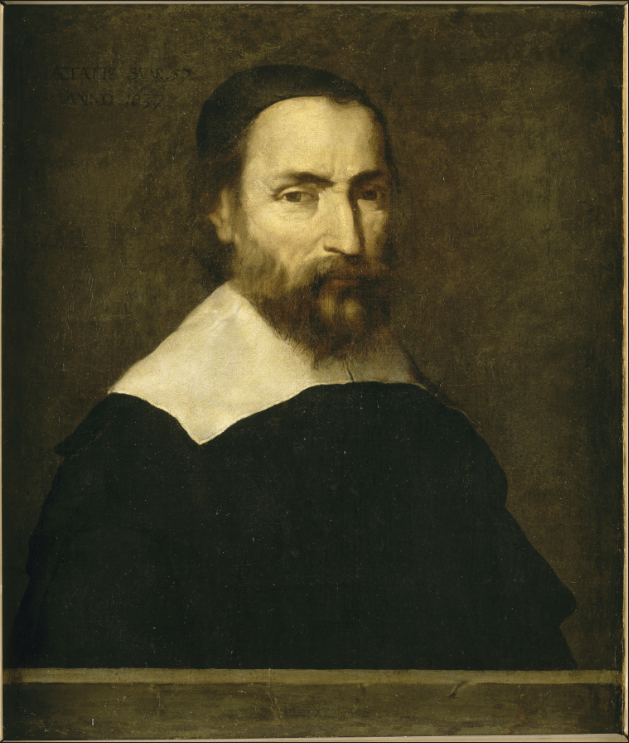
Nicolas-Claude Fabri de Peiresc, discoverer of the Orion Nebula, after whom the lunar impact crater Peirescius is named

- Philip Augustine – Indian gastroenterologist, specialist in gastrointestinal endoscopy
- Baptistin Baille – French scientist and industrialist, lecturer at École polytechnique, and then a professor of optics and acoustics at ESPCI Paris
- Philippe Baumard – organizational scientist who has held visiting professorships at New York University, University of California, Berkeley, Stanford University, and is currently École polytechnique's Chair on Innovation & Regulation, and president of the Scientific Council of France's High Council for Strategic Education and Research
- Jean Bellissard – French theoretical physicist and mathematical physicist, Fellow of the American Mathematical Society (AMS)
- Ariel Beresniak – Swiss specialist in Public Health and Health Economics
- Saviour Bernard – Maltese medical practitioner, scientist, and major philosopher
- Jean-Philippe Bonardi – Dean of HEC Lausanne Business School: 2015–2021
- Mounir Bouchenaki – Algerian archaeologist and director of the Arab Regional Centre for World Heritage
- Jean Boutière – French philologist, former member of the Institute for Catalan Studies
- Maurice de Broglie, 6th Duke of Broglie – President of the French Academy of Sciences: Jan–Dec 1954; Member of the Académie Française: 1934–1960
- Emmanuel Brunet-Jailly – Canadian politics and public policy scholar at the University of Victoria (UVic)
- Veronica Dahl – Argentine/Canadian computer scientist
- Michel Darluc – French medical doctor and naturalist
- Marcelo Dascal – Israeli philosopher and linguist, professor of philosophy at Tel Aviv University (TAU)
- Alexandre del Valle – Italo-French political scientist and geopolitician
- Maurice Dongier – neuropsychiatrist at the Douglas Mental Health University Institute
- François Doumenge – French geographer
- Pierre-Michel Duffieux – French physicist, the founder of Fourier optics
- William A. Earle – American philosopher
- Mansour Mohamed El-Kikhia – Libyan academic and politician
- Pascal Engel – French philosopher, who works on the philosophy of language, philosophy of mind, epistemology and philosophy of logic
- Bruno Étienne – French sociologist and political analyst
- Charles Fabry – General Physics Professor at the University of Paris, Sorbonne and École Polytechnique, member of the French Academy of Sciences and the Royal Society, co-discoverer of the ozone layer
- Arthur Fallot – French physician
- Alain Filloux – Professor and Chair of the Centre for Molecular Bacteriology and Infection at Imperial College London
- F. J. Friend-Pereira – Indian academic and author
- Pierre Joseph Garidel – French botanist
- Pierre Gassendi – French philosopher, priest, scientist, astronomer and mathematician
- Henri Gastaut – French neurologist and epileptologist, former member of the National Academy of Medicine of France and the Royal Academy of Medicine of Belgium
- Jean-Pierre Gattuso – French ocean scientist, CNRS Research Professor at Sorbonne University
- Antoine Marc Gaudin – professor at the Massachusetts Institute of Technology (MIT), and a founding member of the National Academy of Engineering (NAE)
- Éric Geoffroy – French philosopher, islamologist, writer and scholar
- Paul Gourret – French zoologist
- Phạm Hoàng Hiệp – Vietnamese mathematician, winner of the 2019 ICTP Ramanujan Prize
- Yang Huanming – Chinese genetics researcher, director of the Beijing Genomics Institute at the Chinese Academy of Sciences
- Emmanuel Hugot – French astrophysicist
- Fredric Jameson – American literary critic and Marxist political theorist, who has taught at Harvard and Yale
- Eugène Jamot – French physician
- Miro Kačić – Croatian linguist
- Marie Korsaga – Burkinabé astrophysicist
- Florent Krzakala – French physicist and applied mathematician, professor at École Polytechnique Fédérale de Lausanne (EPFL)
- Henry-Louis de La Grange – musicologist and biographer of Gustav Mahler
- Saadi Lahlou – professor in social psychology at the London School of Economics (LSE)
- Janja Lalich – professor of sociology at California State University, Chico
- Thomas Lamarre – Canadian academic, author, Japanologist and member of the faculty of McGill University
- Henri Lefebvre – French sociologist, Marxist intellectual and philosopher
- Éliane Amado Levy-Valensi – French-Israeli psychologist, psychoanalyst and philosopher
- Joseph Lieutaud – a pediatrician to the Louis XV's court, the personal physician to Louis XVI, a member of the French Academy of Sciences and of the Royal Society
- Raphaël Liogier – French sociologist, director of the Observatoire du religieux
- Jean-Pierre Luminet – French astrophysicist, writer and poet
- Randal Marlin – Canadian philosophy professor at Carleton University
- Jean-François Mattéi – French philosopher
- Marco Tulio Medina – Honduran neurologist and scientist
- Ferdinand Mélin-Soucramanien – President of the National Institute of Public Service: 2022–present
- Emmanuel Métais – Director of EDHEC Business School: 2017–present
- Simon Claude Mimouni – French biblical scholar
- Jean-Baptiste Morin – French mathematician, astrologer and astronomer
- Jean-Jacques Nattiez – Canadian semiotician, professor of Musicology at the Université de Montréal
- Yoshiko Ogata – Japanese mathematical physicist, professor at the Research Institute for Mathematical Sciences, Kyoto University
- Naoual Oukkache – Moroccan toxicologist and herpetologist
- Nicola Padfield – Head of Fitzwilliam College of the University of Cambridge: 2013–2019
- Philip M. Parker – INSEAD Chaired Professor of Management Science
- Elisabeth Pate-Cornell – Professor and Founding Chair of the Department of Management Science and Engineering at Stanford University: 2000–2011
- Lucien-Marie Pautrier – French dermatologist
- Nicolas-Claude Fabri de Peiresc – French astronomer, antiquary and savant
- Karine Perraut – French astronomer, director of research at the University of Grenoble-Alpes and member of the International Astronomical Union (IAU)
- René Pomeau – French scholar, member of the Académie des Sciences Morales et Politiques
- Jean-Bernard Racine – professor of geography at the Institute of Geography, Faculty of Geosciences and Environment of the University of Lausanne (UNIL) and at HEC Lausanne Business School
- Léon Rostan – French internist, member of the Académie Nationale de Médecine, and foreign member of the Royal Swedish Academy of Sciences
- Louis Roule – French zoologist, former President of the Société zoologique de France
- Laurent Sagart – director of research at the Centre de recherches linguistiques sur l'Asie orientale, unit of the Centre National de la Recherche Scientifique (CNRS)
- Enric Sala – marine ecologist and an Explorer-in-Residence at National Geographic
- Peng Shige – Chinese mathematician, member of the Chinese Academy of Sciences
- Jean-Athanase Sicard – French neurologist and radiologist
- Antônio Roberto Monteiro Simões – linguist, an associate professor at the University of Kansas
- Jacqueline Naze Tjøtta – Norwegian mathematician
- Gustavo Uzielli – Italian geologist, historian, and scientist
- David Veesler – French biochemist
- Jean Véronis – French linguist, computer scientist and blogger
- Jane Zemiro – Australian academic and author

== Business and economics ==
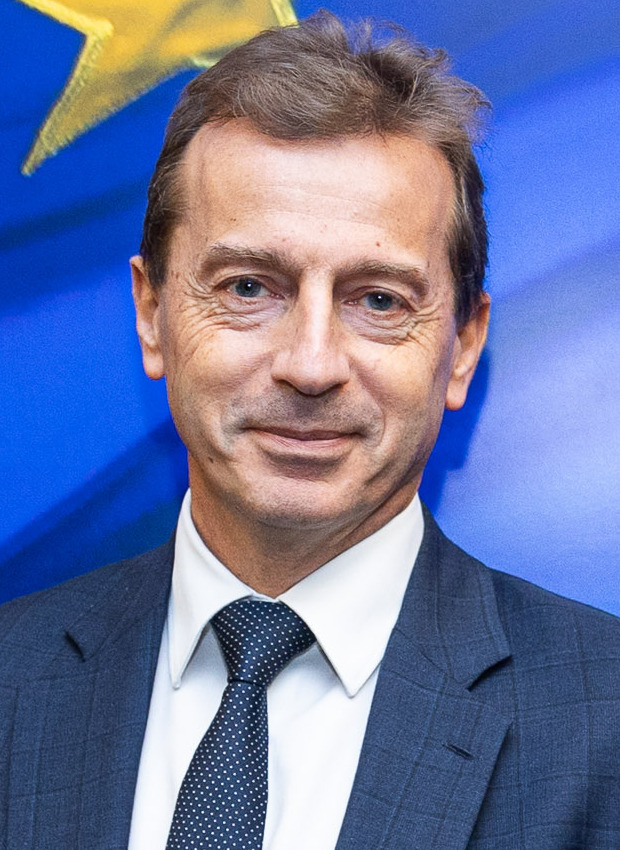
Guillaume Faury, current CEO of Airbus

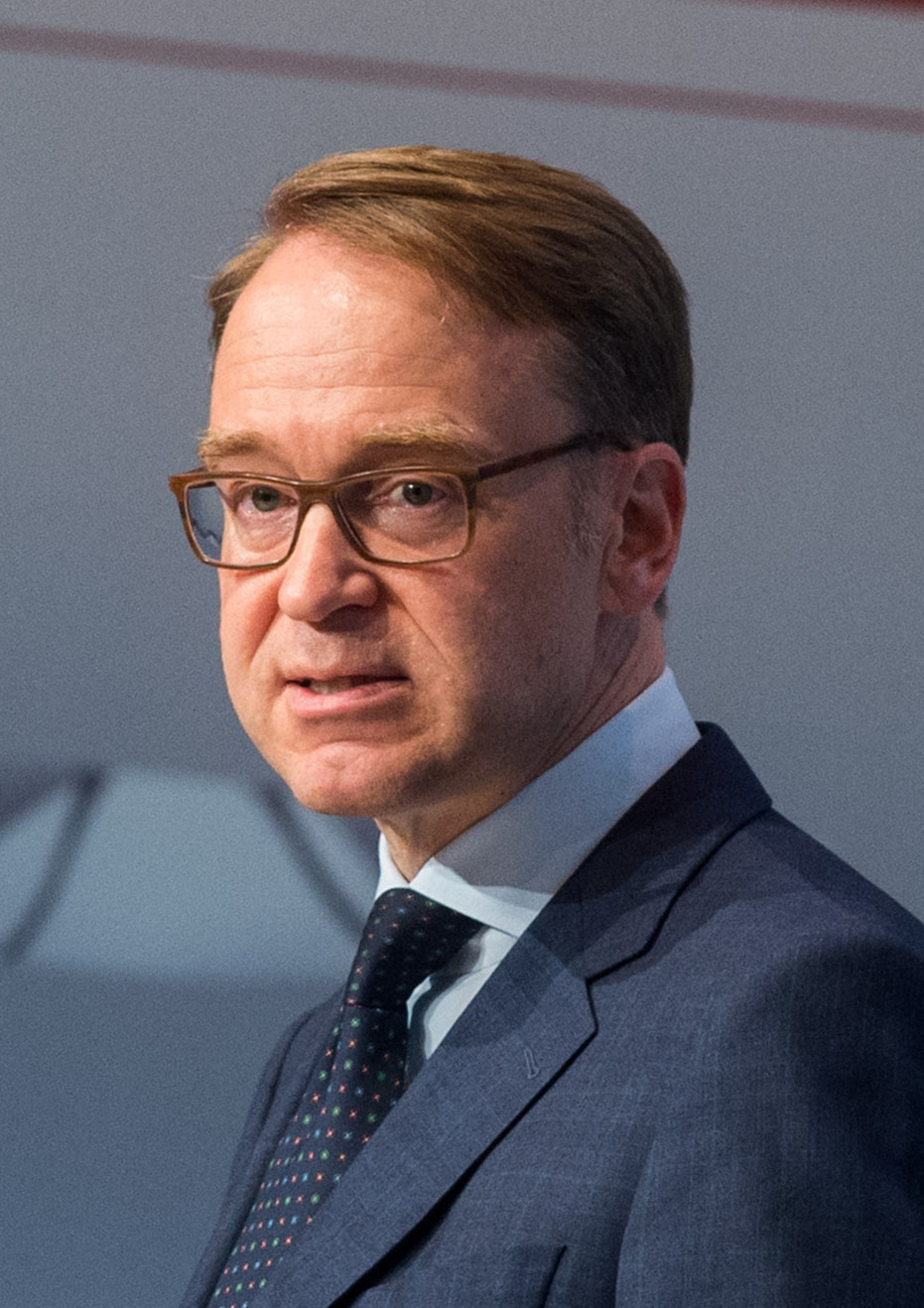
Jens Weidmann, President of the Deutsche Bundesbank from 2011 to 2021 and Chair of the Bank for International Settlements from 2015 to 2021

- Olivier Baussan – French businessman, the founder of L'Occitane en Provence, Oliviers & Co and Première Pression Provence
- Sunil Benimadhu – Chief Executive of the Stock Exchange of Mauritius (SEM): 1998–2026
- Philippe Bourguignon – member of the board of directors of eBay, former co-chief executive officer of the World Economic Forum (WEF)
- Philippe Carli – Head of Éditions Philippe Amaury (EPA): 2010–2015
- Frédéric Docquier – Belgian economist and Professor of Economics at UCLouvain
- Samuel Dossou-Aworet – Beninese businessman and engineer
- Pierre Falcone – French businessman, the Chairman of Pierson Capital Group
- Guillaume Faury – CEO of Airbus: 2019–present
- Jean-Marc Forneri – CEO of Rossignol: 1988–1994; Managing Partner of Banque Worms: 1994–1996; President of Credit Suisse: 1996–2004
- Bernard Gainnier – Chairman and CEO of PwC France and Maghreb: 2013–2021
- Christian Garin – President of Marseille-Fos Port: 2004–2008
- Xavier Giocanti – French businessman and entrepreneur
- Gilles Grapinet – Chairman of Worldline: 2013–2021; CEO of Worldline: 2013–2024
- Peter Hambro – founder of Peter Hambro Mining and a non-executive director of the Private Banking Division of Société Générale
- Rupert Hambro – British heir, banker, businessman and philanthropist
- Nabil Karoui – Tunisian businessman and politician
- Chips Keswick – non-executive director of DeBeers Sa, Investec Bank, Persimmon plc, Arsenal Holdings plc (the parent company of Arsenal F.C.), and former director of the Bank of England
- Angus Maddison – British economist, emeritus professor at the Faculty of Economics at the University of Groningen
- Demetrios Mantzounis – CEO of Alpha Bank: 2005–2018
- Henri J. Nijdam – Publishing and Editorial Director of Le Nouvel Économiste
- Jean-François Rischard – Vice-President of the World Bank: 1998–2005
- Rémy Weber – CEO of La Banque Postale: 2013–2020
- Jens Weidmann – President of the Deutsche Bundesbank (DBB): 2011–2021; Chair of the Bank for International Settlements (BIS): 2015–2021

== Sports ==
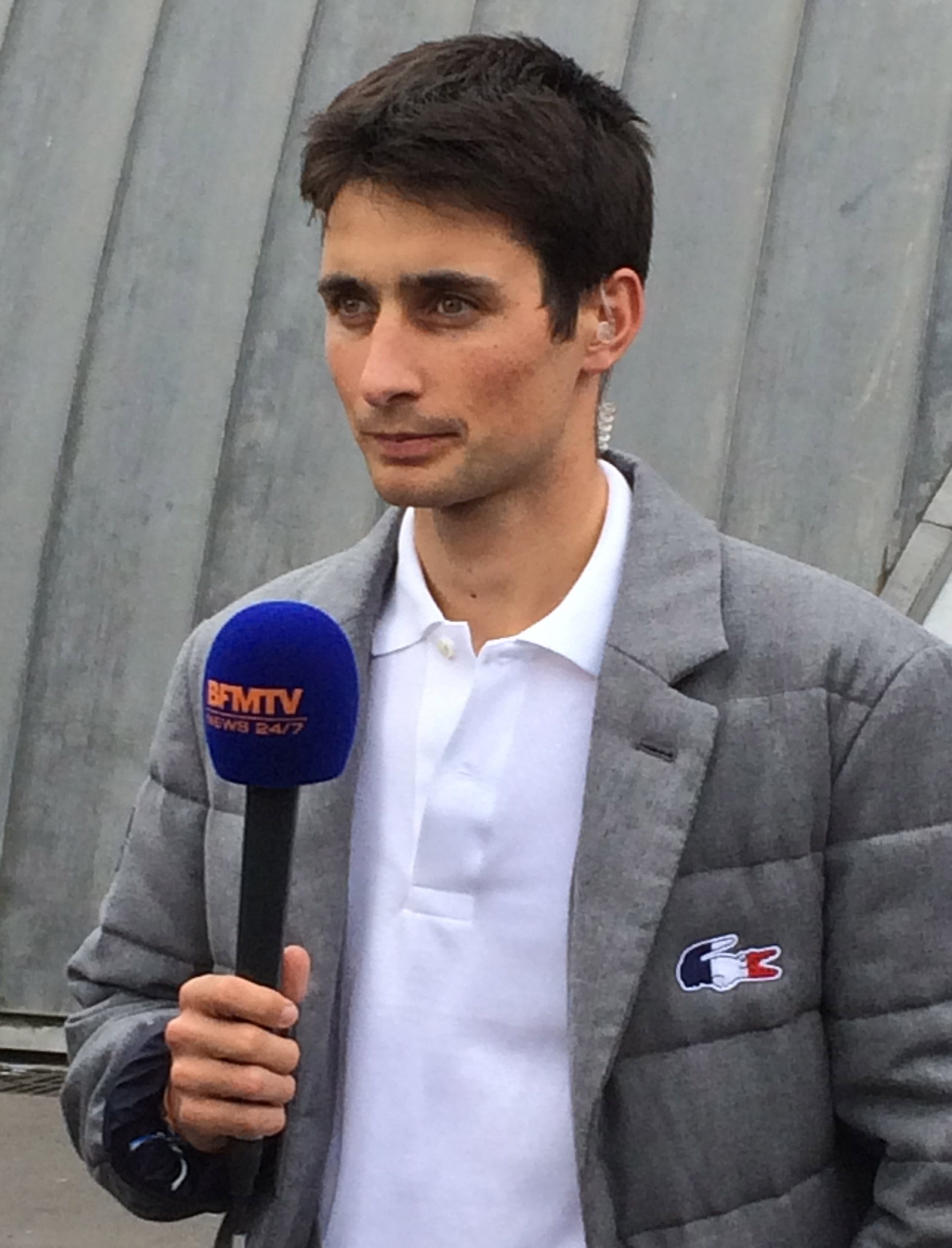
Jason Lamy-Chappuis, Olympic gold medalist in Nordic combined at the 2010 Winter Olympics

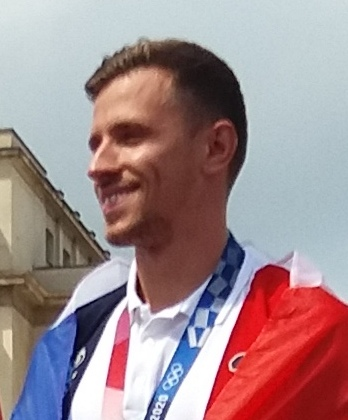
Jean Quiquampoix, Olympic gold medalist in shooting at the 2020 Summer Olympics

- Yunis Abdelhamid – Moroccan footballer who plays as a defender for Stade de Reims
- Sandrine Aubert – four-time winner in the FIS Alpine Ski World Cup
- Jean-Pierre Bernès – General Manager of Olympique de Marseille: 1989–1994
- Marie-Paule Blé – French taekwondo athlete
- Frédérick Bousquet – French freestyle and butterfly swimmer, Olympic silver medalist in swimming at the 2008 Summer Olympics
- Alexandre Camarasa – former French water polo player
- Cecile Canqueteau-Landi – French gymnastics coach and former artistic gymnast
- Camille Chevalier – French professional golfer
- Mohamed Diop – Senegalese basketball player
- Pape Diouf – President of Olympique de Marseille: 2005–2009
- Aline Friess – French artistic gymnast
- Anthony Giacobazzi – former French rugby union player for RC Toulon
- Jean-Luc Gripond – President of FC Nantes: 2001–2005
- Souhail Hamouchane – Moroccan swimmer
- Sarah Hanffou – Cameroonian table tennis player
- Salim Heroui – Algerian fencer
- Sarah Huchet – French footballer who plays as a midfielder for Fiorentina
- Mathilde Lamolle – French sports shooter
- Jason Lamy-Chappuis – Franco-American ski jumper and cross-country skier, Olympic gold medalist in Nordic combined at the 2010 Winter Olympics
- Alain Mosconi – French swimmer, Olympic bronze medalist in swimming at the 1968 Summer Olympics
- Michel Nandan – Monaco-based motor sport executive
- Jean Quiquampoix – French sports shooter, Olympic silver medalist in shooting at the 2016 Summer Olympics, and Olympic gold medalist in shooting at the 2020 Summer Olympics
- Alexandra Recchia – French karate athlete, five-time world champion
- Léa Rubio – French footballer who plays as a midfielder for Olympique de Marseille
- Lili Sebesi – French sports sailor

== Miscellaneous ==
- Barry Jean Ancelet – Cajun folklorist, expert in Cajun music and Cajun French
- Isabelle Arvers – French media art curator, critic and author, specializing in video and computer games, web animation, digital cinema, retrogaming, chiptunes and machinima
- Dominique Bénard – former Deputy Secretary-General of the World Organization of the Scout Movement (WOSM)
- Gaston Berger – French futurist, industrialist and philosopher
- James Birch – English art dealer, curator and gallery owner
- Jean-Baptiste de Brancas – Bishop of La Rochelle: 1725–1729; Archbishop of Aix-en-Provence: 1729–1770
- Paul Alphéran de Bussan – Bishop of Malta: 1728–1757
- Chucrallah-Nabil El-Hage – archeparch of the Maronite Catholic Archeparchy of Tyre: 2003–2020
- Henri Fabre – French aviator, the inventor of the first successful seaplane, Fabre Hydravion
- Christopher Fomunyoh – senior associate for Africa and regional director at the National Democratic Institute for International Affairs (NDI)
- Emmanuel Goffi – French Air Force Officer
- André Lanata – Chief of Staff of the French Air and Space Force: 2015–2018; Commander of NATO’s Allied Command Transformation: 2018–2021
- Dai Llewellyn – Welsh socialite
- Claude Njiké-Bergeret – development aid volunteer
- Jean-Michel Parasiliti di Para, Antoine IV – the head of household for the Kingdom of Araucanía and Patagonia: 2014–2017
- Jacques Polge – French perfumer, Head Perfumer at Les Parfums Chanel: 1978–2015
- Henri Antoine Marie Teissier – French-Algerian Catholic bishop and archbishop emeritus of Algiers
- Sławosz Uznański-Wiśniewski – Polish astronaut and engineer
- Nguyen Xuan Vinh – Commander of Republic of Vietnam Air Force: 1958–1962
