= Timeline of Aix-en-Provence =

The following is a timeline of the history of the city of Aix-en-Provence.

== Prior to 18th century ==
- 123 BCE – Aquae Sextiae founded.
- 102 BCE – Battle of Aquae Sextiae.
- 1st century CE – Roman Catholic diocese of Aix established.
- 477 – Visigoths in power.
- 731 – Saracens in power.
- 12th century – Aix Cathedral construction begins.
- 1112 – Religious council held in Aix.
- 1277 – Saint-Jean-de-Malte Church built.
- 1409 – University founded.
- 1487 – Aix becomes part of the Crown lands of France.
- 1501 – Regional Parlement of Aix-en-Provence established.
- 1505 – Clock tower built.
- 1651 – Hôtel de Suffren built on the Cours Mirabeau.
- 1667 – Pavillon Vendôme (residence) built.
- 1668 – Hôtel de Ville (City Hall) completed.

== 18th–19th centuries ==
- 1703 – Église de la Madeleine (Aix-en-Provence) (church) built.
- 1705 – "Bathing establishment" constructed.
- 1756 – Theatre built.
- 1777 – Completion of Bastide d'Orcel.
- 1790
  - Regional Parlement of Aix-en-Provence dissolved.
  - Aix becomes part of the Bouches du Rhône souveraineté.
- 1807 – Académie des sciences, agriculture, arts et belles-lettres d'Aix founded.
- 1810 – Bibliothèque Méjanes (library) opens.
- 1838
  - October: Religious Council of Aix-en-Provence held.
  - Musée Granet opens.
  - Museum d'Histoire Naturelle Aix-en-Provence founded.
- 1839 – 19 January: Birth of Paul Cézanne.
- 1860 – Fontaine de la Rotonde installed.
- 1881 – Population: 23,887.

== 20th century ==
- 1903 – Société d'études provençales (learned society) founded.
- 1906 – Population: 19,433.
- 1910 – Musée des Tapisseries d'Aix-en-Provence opens.
- 1911 – Musée Arbaud founded.
- 1912 – Fountain installed in the Place d'Albertas.
- 1945 – Henri Mouret becomes mayor.
- 1946 – Aix-en-Provence Military School active.
- 1948 – Aix-en-Provence Festival of music begins.
- 1954 – Population: 54,217.
- 1960 – Aix twinned with Tübingen, Germany.
- 1966 – Archives Nationales d'Outre-Mer established in Aix.
- 1967 - Félix Ciccolini becomes mayor.
- 1968 - Population: 89,566.
- 1969 - Société aixoise d'études historiques (historical society) founded.
- 1970 - Aix twinned with Perugia, Italy.
- 1974 – Centre de Documentation Historique sur l'Algérie headquartered in Aix.
- 1975 – Population: 110,659.
- 1976 – Café-Théâtre de la Fontaine d'Argent opens.
- 1977
  - Fountain installed in the Place des Cardeurs.
  - Aix twinned with Bath, England.
- 1978 – Alain Joissains becomes mayor.
- 1979 – Aix twinned with Granada, Spain.
- 1982
  - Canton of Aix-en-Provence-Centre created.
  - Aix becomes part of the Provence-Alpes-Côte d'Azur region.
- 1983 – Jean-Pierre de Peretti Della Rocca becomes mayor.
- 1985 – Aix twinned with Coimbra, Portugal.
- 1986 – March: Provence-Alpes-Côte d'Azur regional election, 1986 held.
- 1989 – Jean-François Picheral becomes mayor.
- 1992 – Aix twinned with Carthage, Tunisia.
- 1995 – Aix twinned with Ashkelon, Israel.
- 1999 – Population: 133,018.

== 21st century ==
- 2001
  - Maryse Joissains-Masini becomes mayor.
  - Communauté d'agglomération du pays d'Aix created.
- 2007 – Grand Théâtre de Provence opens.
- 2011 – Population: 140,684.
- 2015 – December: 2015 Provence-Alpes-Côte d'Azur regional election held.
- 2016 – Metropolis of Aix-Marseille-Provence established.

== See also ==
- History of Aix-en-Provence
- List of mayors of Aix-en-Provence
- List of heritage sites in Aix-en-Provence
- History of Provence region
- Timeline of Provence region

Other cities in the Provence-Alpes-Côte d'Azur region:

- Timeline of Arles
- Timeline of Avignon
- Timeline of Marseille
- Timeline of Nice
- Timeline of Toulon

== Bibliography ==
=== in English ===
- Abraham Rees (1819), "Aix", The Cyclopaedia, London: Longman, Hurst, Rees, Orme & Brown, hdl:2027/mdp.39015012313022
- "Aix", Handbook for Travellers in France, London: John Murray, 1861
- "Aix". South-Eastern France (3rd ed.). Leipsic: Karl Baedeker. 1898.
- "Aix". Chambers's Encyclopaedia. London. 1901. hdl:2027/hvd.hn52jl.
- "Aix" . Encyclopædia Britannica. Vol. 1 (11th ed.). 1910. p. 448.
- Herbermann, Charles George; Pace, Edward Aloysius (1913). "Aix-en-Provence". Catholic Encyclopedia. New York.

=== in French ===
- Jean-Baptiste-Joseph Champagnac [in French] (1839). "Aix". Manuel des dates, en forme de dictionnaire (in French). Perisse frères.
- "Aix". Provence. Guides Joanne (in French). 1906. hdl:2027/uc1.$b192331.
- "Aix-en-Provence". Dictionnaire Bouillet (in French) (34th ed.). Hachette. 1914. hdl:2027/mdp.39015074817142.
