= Joissains =

Joissains is a surname. Notable people with the surname include:

- Alain Joissains, French politician
- Maryse Joissains (born 1942), French politician
- Sophie Joissains (born 1969), French politician
