= Alexandre de Fauris de Saint-Vincens =

French lawyer and politician (1750–1815)

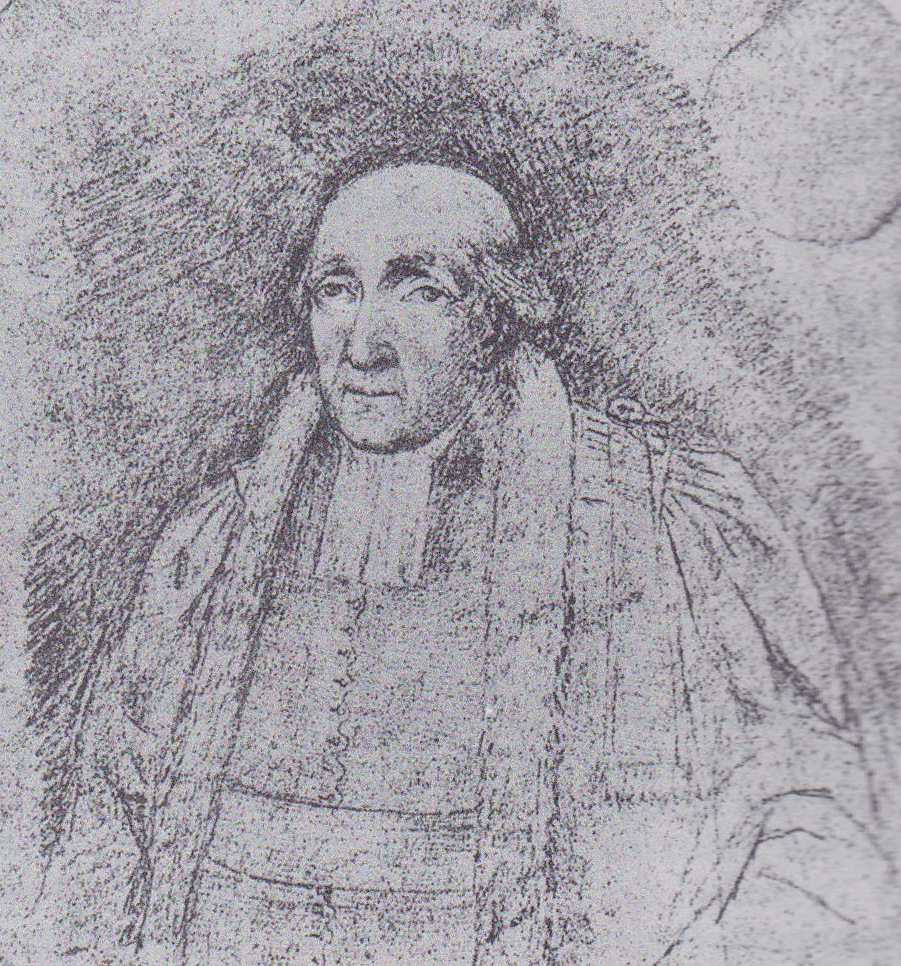
- Born: 1 September 1750; Aix-en-Provence, France
- Died: 15 November 1815 (aged 65); Aix-en-Provence, France
- Occupations: Lawyer; Politician
- Spouse: Marguerite Dorothée de Trimont
- Parent(s): Jules-François-Paul Fauris de Saint-Vincens; Julie de Villeneuve de Vence

Alexandre de Fauris de Saint-Vincens (1 September 1750 – 15 November 1815) was a French lawyer and politician. He served as the Mayor of Aix-en-Provence from 1808 to 1809, and he served in the National Assembly in 1814.

== Biography ==
=== Early life ===
Alexandre de Fauris de Saint-Vincens was born on 1 September 1750 in Aix-en-Provence. His father, Jules-François-Paul Fauris de Saint-Vincens (1718–1798) served as the President à mortier of the Parlement of Aix-en-Provence in 1746. His mother, Julie de Villeneuve de Vence (1726–1778), came from an old aristocratic family. He was baptised in the Église du Saint-Esprit in Aix on 3 September 1750, only two days after his birth. He grew up in the Hôtel Raousset-Boulbon, a family hôtel particulier located at number 14 on the Cours Mirabeau in Aix. He was educated at the College of Juilly, a Catholic school in Juilly, Seine-et-Marne.

=== Career ===
He served as President a mortier of the Parlement of Aix-en-Provence in 1782.

He served as the Mayor of Aix-en-Provence from 13 August 1808 to 20 November 1809. Additionally, he served as President of the Court of Appeals of Aix from 1811 to 1819. He also served in the Corps législatif, and as a member of the National Assembly in 1814.

In 1811, he was made a Knight of the French Empire. Additionally, he became an Officer of the Legion of Honour.

=== Personal life ===
In 1781, he married Marguerite Dorothée de Trimont. They resided in the Hôtel Raousset-Boulbon.

He died on 15 November 1815 in Aix and was buried in the Saint-Pierre Cemetery.

Political offices
Preceded by Jean-Baptiste-Boniface de Fortis	Mayor of Aix-en-Provence; 1808-1809	Succeeded by Jean-Baptiste-Boniface de Fortis
