= Coquand =

Coquand is a French surname. Notable people with the surname include:

- Henri Coquand (1813–1881), French geologist and paleontologist
- Thierry Coquand (born 1961), French computer scientist and mathematician
