= Jules-François-Paul Fauris de Saint-Vincens =

French lawyer, politician, historian, and numismatist (1718–1798)

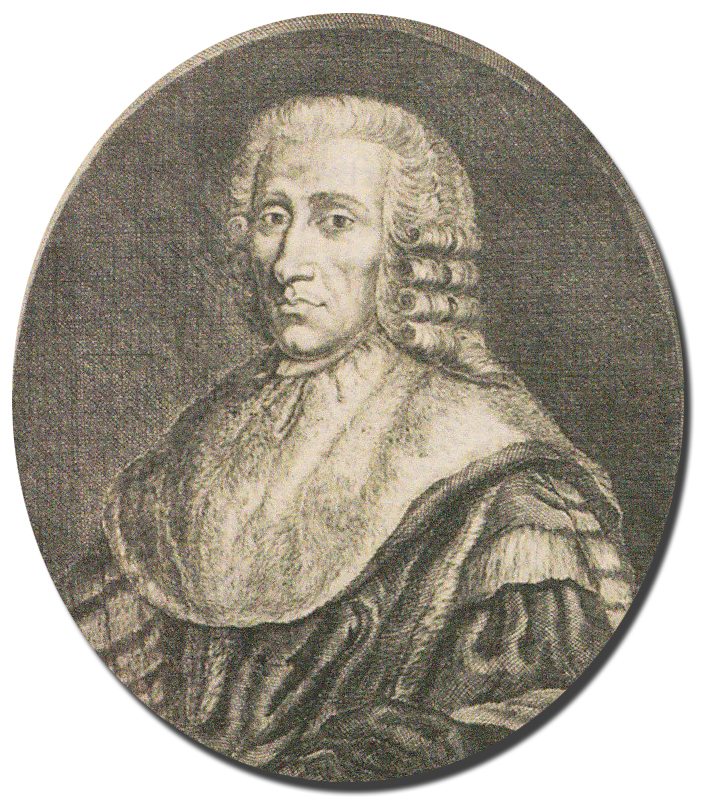
- Born: 21 July 1718; Aix-en-Provence, France
- Died: 22 October 1798 (aged 80); Aix-en-Provence, France
- Occupations: Lawyer; Politician
- Spouse: Julie de Villeneuve de Vence
- Children: Alexandre de Fauris de Saint-Vincens
- Parent: Antoine de Fauris

Jules-François-Paul Fauris de Saint-Vincens (1718–1798) was a French lawyer, politician, historian and numismatist.

== Biography ==
=== Early life ===
Jules-François-Paul Fauris de Saint-Vincens was born on 21 July 1718 in Aix-en-Provence. He was baptised in the Église du Saint-Esprit in Aix. His father was Antoine de Fauris. He grew up in the Hôtel Raousset-Boulbon, a Hôtel particulier located at 14 on the Cours Mirabeau in Aix.

=== Career ===
He started serving as an Advisor to the Parlement of Aix-en-Provence from 10 October 1737. By 1746, he served as its President à mortier. He then served as Second President in 1776.

He was one of the co-founders of the Académie d'Aix-en-Provence. An aficionado of numismatics, his Table des monnaies de Provence is a very thorough summary of the coins used in Provence during the Middle Ages. His collection of old books was bequeathed to the Bibliothèque Méjanes, the public library in Aix, after his death.

=== Personal life ===
He married Julie Rossoline de Villeneuve de Vence. They had two children:

- Sophie de Fauris de Noyers de Saint-Vincens (1747–1781).
- Alexandre de Fauris de Saint-Vincens (1750–1815).

He died on 22 October 1798 in Aix.

== Bibliography ==
- Mémoires et observations, insérées dans le Recueil de l'académie des inscriptions
- Table des monnaies de Provence
- Mémoire sur les monnaies et les monuments des anciens marseillais
