= List of mayors of Aix-en-Provence =

The following is a list of mayors of Aix-en-Provence, France.

List of mayors of Aix-en-Provence
Term	Name
1790	Jean Espariat
1790	Toussaint-Bernard Émeric-David
1791	Jean Espariat
1792	Laurent Elzéar Perrin
1793	Mériaud
1793	J. L. Émeric
1796	Laurin
1797	Reverdit
1798	J. L. Émeric
1798	Brignon
1799	Orcel
1800	Brignon
1802	François Sallier
1806	Antoine Alexis
1806	Jean-Baptiste-Boniface de Fortis
1808	Alexandre de Fauris de Saint-Vincens
1809	Jean-Baptiste-Boniface de Fortis
1811	Jean-Baptiste Paul Gras
1815	Joseph Dubreuil
1815	Jean-Baptiste Paul Gras
1815	Gaston d'Olivary
1816	Louis d'Estienne du Bourguet
1830	Joseph Chambaud
1830	Ambroise Mottet
1831	Joseph Chambaud
1835	Antoine Aude
1848	Jassuda Bédarrides
1849	Michel Toussaint
1849	Félicien Agard
1849	Émile Rigaud
1863	Pascal Paul Roux
1870	Jean-Philippe Alexis
1871	Jules Vieil
1871	Gustave Heiriès
1873	Martial Bouteille
1874	Eugène de Mougins de Roquefort
1876	Salomon Bédarrides
1877	Eugène de Mougins de Roquefort
1877	Salomon Bédarrides
1884	Henri Tassy
1884	Alfred Gautier
1886	François Mandin
1888	Benjamin Abram
1896	Gabriel Baron
1897	Maurice Bertrand
1902	Joseph Cabassol
1908	Maurice Bertrand
1919	Joseph Jourdan
1925	Eugène Debazac
1929	Joseph Jourdan
1934	Louis Coirard
1935	Jean Peytral
1940	Célestin Coq
1944	Jules Schuller
1945	Henri Mouret
1967	Félix Ciccolini
1978	Alain Joissains
1983	Jean-Pierre de Peretti Della Rocca
1989	Jean-François Picheral
2001	Maryse Joissains-Masini
2021	Sophie Joissains

== See also ==
- Timeline of Aix-en-Provence
