= Église du Saint-Esprit =

Église du Saint-Esprit may refer to:

- Église du Saint-Esprit (Paris), France
- Église du Saint-Esprit (Aix-en-Provence), France
- Église Saint-Esprit-de-Rosemont, Montreal, Canada
