= Antoine Aude =

French lawyer, politician (1799–1870)

- Born: January 17, 1799; Aix-en-Provence, France
- Died: March 19, 1870 (aged 71); Aix-en-Provence, France
- Occupations: Lawyer; Politician
- Spouse: Thérèse Heiriès
- Children: Philippe Félix Sextius Aude
- Parent: Antoine-Laurent-Michel Aude

Antoine Aude (1799–1870) was a French lawyer and politician. He served as the Mayor of Aix-en-Provence from 1835 to 1848.

== Biography ==
=== Early life ===
Antoine Aude was born on January 17, 1799, in Aix-en-Provence. His father, Antoine-Laurent-Michel Aude, was a lawyer at the Parlement of Aix-en-Provence before the French Revolution, then a Professor of Law, and he worked for the city council during the Revolution. He studied the Law alongside François-Auguste Mignet (1796-1884) and Adolphe Thiers (1797-1877).

=== Career ===
He started his career as a lawyer in Aix.

He decided to embark upon a career in politics. He served as an advisor to the Mayor, Joseph Chambaud, during the cholera epidemic of 1835. He went on to serve as the mayor of Aix-en-Provence from 1835 to 1848. During his tenure, he brought gas lighting to the town, commissioned the construction of a canal built by François Zola (1796-1847), conceived the Canal du Verdon for water distribution (since then replaced by the Canal de Provence), commissioned the construction of a railroad track from Aix to Rognac, and established the Faculty of Letters, the Ecole Nationale des Arts et Métiers and a mental asylum. He also conceived the Museum d'Histoire Naturelle Aix-en-Provence, together with his son.

He stepped down during the French Revolution of 1848, when he handed it over to Émile Ollivier (1825–1913). Shortly after, Jassuda Bédarrides would become the next Mayor of Aix.

He received the Knighthood of the Legion of Honour for his public service.

=== Personal life ===
He married Thérèse Heiriès (1804-1851). They had a son:

- Philippe Félix Sextius Aude (1836-1912).

He died on March 19, 1870.

=== Legacy ===
- The Rue Antoine Aude in Aix-en-Provence is named in his honour. Formerly known as the Rue de l'Official, it changed its name in 1870.

Political offices
Preceded by Joseph Chambaud	Mayor of Aix-en-Provence; 1835-1848	Succeeded by Jassuda Bédarrides
