= Jean Espariat =

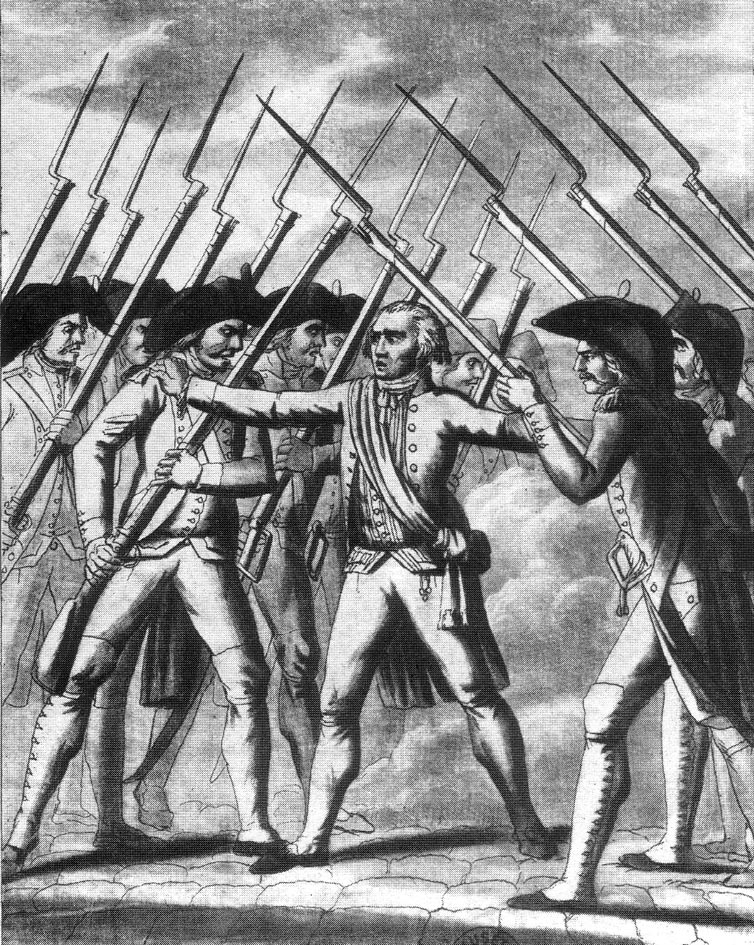
- Born: 17 September 1747; Aix-en-Provence, France
- Died: 14 January 1827 (aged 79); Aix-en-Provence, France
- Occupations: Lawyer; Politician

Jean Espariat (17 September 1747 – 14 January 1827) was a French lawyer and politician. He served as the first Mayor of Aix-en-Provence in 1790, and again as the third Mayor from 1791 to 1792. Additionally, he helped create the department of the Bouches-du-Rhône and served as a member of the Legislative Assembly from 1791 to 1792.

== Biography ==
Jean Espariat was born on 17 September 1747 in Aix-en-Provence. His father, Charles Espariat, was a silversmith and later a lawyer in the Parlement of Aix-en-Provence.

After the Ancien Régime came to an end and the Parlement of Aix-en-Provence was dismantled by the French Revolution, Espariat was elected as first Mayor of Aix-en-Provence on 10 February 1790. However, the early days were still chaotic. He was a moderate. Indeed, on the Cours Saint-Louis in Aix, he stopped the Vexin regiment, a pro-revolutionary regiment, and the Royal Marine regiment, a pro-aristocratic regiment, from killing each other.

He stepped down on 11 November 1790 and let the Vice Mayor, Toussaint-Bernard Émeric-David, serve as Mayor. During that time, lawyer Jean-Joseph-Pierre Pascalis (1732-1790), a royalist, was killed during the riots of December 1790 in Aix-en-Provence. Meanwhile, together with Antoine Balthazar Joachim, baron d'André (1759 -1825) and an abbey from Quinson, he helped establish the department of the Bouches-du-Rhône.

He served as a member of the Legislative Assembly from September 1791 to 1792, when he condemned the revolutionary crimes in Avignon. He also returned as Mayor of Aix on 1 September 1791 until 20 September 1792. He was jailed during the Reign of Terror of 1793–1794. During the French Directory of 1795 to 1799, he served as an administrator of the department of the Bouches-du-Rhône he had helped create. During the French Consulate of 1799–1804, he served as a magistrate in the Criminal Court of the Bouches-du-Rhône.

He received the Knighthood of the Legion of Honour for his public service.

He died on 14 January 1827 in Aix-en-Provence.

Political offices
Preceded by -	Mayor of Aix-en-Provence; 1790	Succeeded by Toussaint-Bernard Émeric-David
Preceded by Toussaint-Bernard Émeric-David	Mayor of Aix-en-Provence; 1791-1792	Succeeded by Laurent Elzéar Perrin
