= Jassuda Bédarrides =

- Born: 2 April 1804; Aix-en-Provence, France
- Died: 4 February 1882 (aged 77); Aix-en-Provence, France
- Occupations: Lawyer; Politician
- Relatives: Salomon Bédarrides (brother); Benjamin Abram (nephew)

Jassuda Bédarrides (2 April 1804 – 4 February 1882) was a French lawyer and politician. He served as the Mayor of Aix-en-Provence from 1848 to 1849. As such, he was the first Jewish Mayor of this city.

== Biography ==
=== Early life ===
Jassuda Bédarrides was born in a Jewish family on April 2, 1804, in Aix-en-Provence. He had a brother, Salomon Bédarrides, who went on to serve as the mayor of Aix-en-Provence from 1877 to 1884. He also had a sister, Précieuse Bédarrides, who married Abraham Abram, a Jewish businessman from Marseille; their son, Benjamin Abram (1846-1938), went on to serve as the mayor of Aix-en-Provence from 1888 to 1896.

=== Career ===
He started his career as a lawyer, becoming the first Jewish lawyer in Aix-en-Provence. He wrote several books about jurisprudence. He also served as bâtonnier.

A supporter of the Republic, he embarked upon a career in politics. He served as the mayor of Aix-en-Provence from March 12, 1848, to May 18, 1849. As such, he became the first Jewish Mayor of this city. In April 1848, he planted the Tree of Freedom on the Place des Precheurs to celebrate the French Republic. During his tenure, he also commissioned the construction of new buildings for factory workers and a new slaughterhouse (demolished and now the Pasino), as well as the restoration of a lycee and of a museum. He also served on the General Council

Later, he served as a member of the Consistory of Marseille. He also became an officer of the Legion of Honour on July 13, 1880.

=== Personal life ===
He resided at number 7 on the Rue Bellegarde (now known as the Rue Mignet) in Aix.

=== Death ===
He died on February 4, 1882, in Aix-en-Provence.

=== Legacy ===
The Rue Bédarrides in Aix-en-Provence is named in his honour and his brother's.

== Bibliography ==
- Traité des faillites et banqueroutes ou commentaire de la loi du 28 mai 1838
- Traité du dol et de la fraude en matière civile et commerciale
- De la lettre de change, des billets à ordre et de la prescription
- Des achats et ventes
- Des chemins de fer au point de vue du transport des voyageurs et des marchandises

Political offices
Preceded by Antoine Aude	Mayor of Aix-en-Provence; 1848-1849	Succeeded by Michel Toussaint
