= Hôtel Raousset-Boulbon =

Coordinates: 43.5264°N 5.4475°E

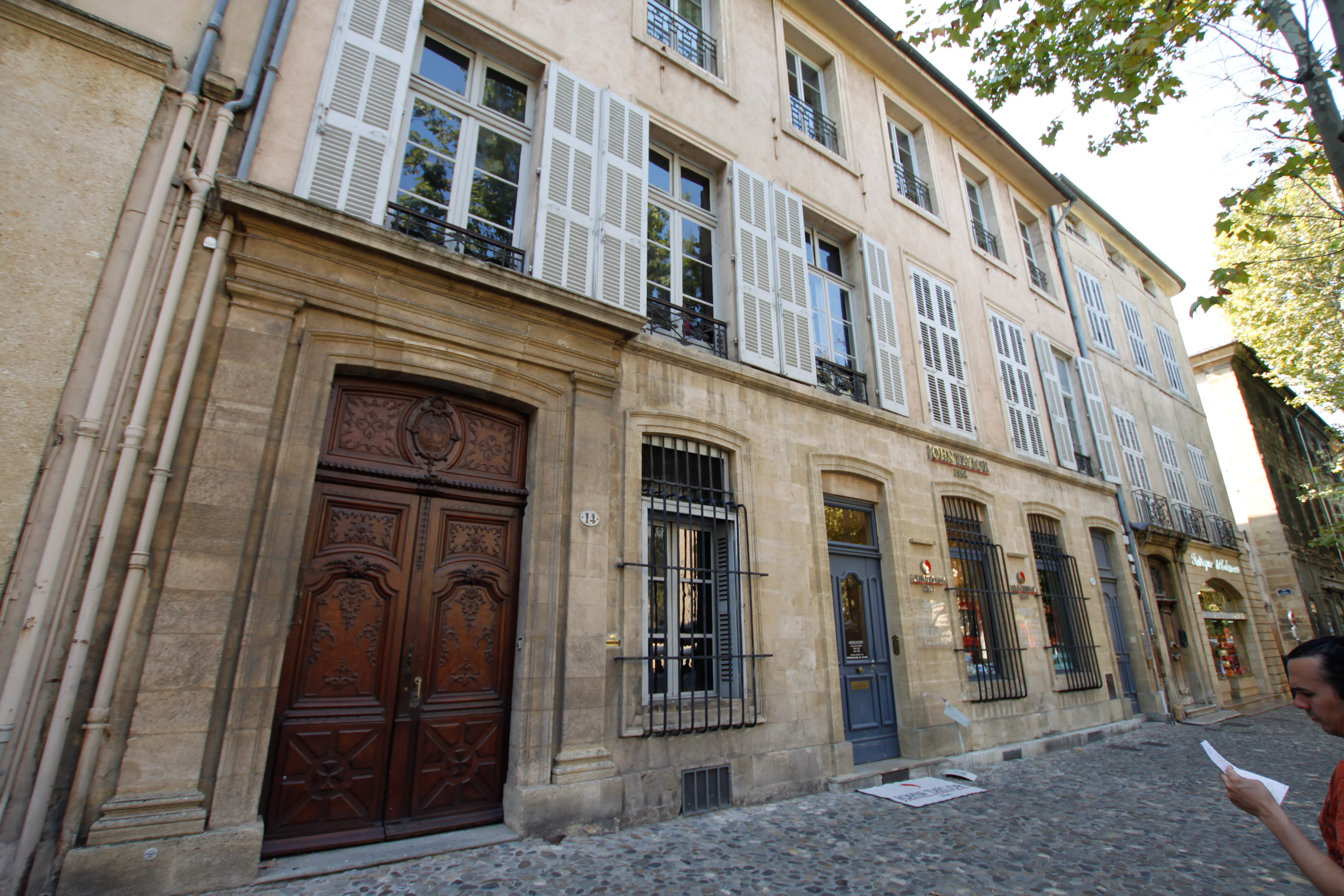

General information
- Type: Hôtel particulier
- Location: 14 Cours Mirabeau, Aix-en-Provence, France
- Completed: 1660

Main portal

The Hôtel Raousset-Boulbon (a.k.a. Hôtel Fauris de Saint-Vincens) is a listed hôtel particulier in Aix-en-Provence.

== Location ==
It is located at number 14 on the Cours Mirabeau in Aix-en-Provence.

== History ==
It was built in 1660 for Honoré de Rascas, Lord of Le Cannet and Advisor to the Parlement of Aix-en-Provence.

It was purchased by Antoine de Fauris in 1739. It later became the private residence of his son, Jules-François-Paul Fauris de Saint-Vincens (1718–1798), who served as the President à mortier of the Parlement of Aix-en-Provence in 1746. Later, his grandson, Alexandre de Fauris de Saint-Vincens (1750–1815), who served as president a mortier of the Parlement of Aix-en-Provence in 1782 and later as Mayor of Aix-en-Provence from 1808 to 1809, lived there too.

On the ground floor, there is a vestibule, a big lounge looking out to a private garden, a bedroom and a library, as well as two additional rooms which are rented out to the Société Générale, a French bank. On the first floor, there is another big lounge, another bedroom and another library, all looking out to the garden. There is also a second floor.

== Heritage significance ==
Since 1983, the building has been listed as a monument historique.
