= Benjamin Abram =

French lawyer and politician

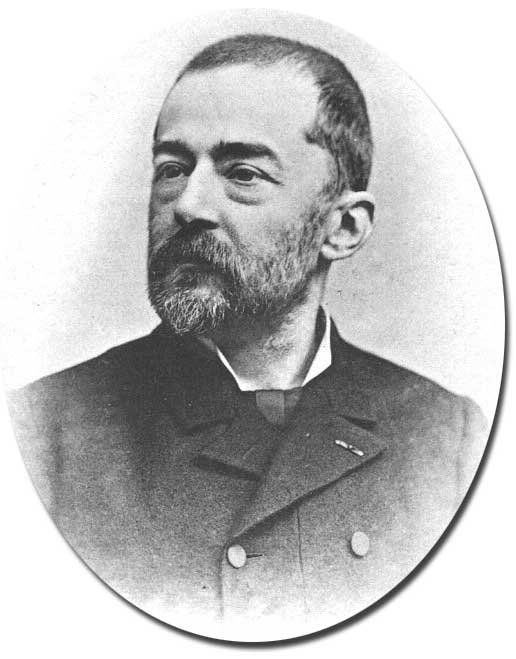
- Born: 23 September 1846; Marseille, France
- Died: 30 April 1938 (aged 91); Aix-en-Provence, France
- Occupations: Lawyer; Politician
- Spouse: Esther Baze
- Children: Samuel Élie Paul Abram; Maurice David Joseph Abram
- Parents: Abraham Abram; Précieuse Bédarrides

Benjamin Abram (23 September 1846 – 30 April 1938) was a French lawyer and politician. He served as the Mayor of Aix-en-Provence from 1888 to 1896. He was the third Jewish Mayor of Aix-en-Provence and abandoned politics after the debacle of the antisemitic Dreyfus affair.

== Early life ==
Benjamin Abram was born to a Jewish family on 23 September 1846 in Marseille. His father, Abraham Abram, was a businessman, and his mother was Précieuse Bédarrides. As a result, Jassuda Bédarrides (1804–1882), who served as the first Jewish Mayor of Aix-en-Provence from 1848 to 1849, was his maternal uncle. Another uncle, Salomon Bédarrides, went on to serve as the mayor of Aix-en-Provence from 1877 to 1884.

He was educated at the Lycée Thiers in Marseille and studied the Law at the University of Aix-en-Provence.

== Career ==
He started his career as a lawyer in 1866. He served as bâtonnier from 1885 to 1887.

A supporter of the Republic and a Freemason, he embarked upon a career in politics. He served on the General Council representing Lambesc from 1880 to 1898. He received the Knighthood of the Legion of Honour in 1887.

He served as Mayor of Aix-en-Provence from 1888 to 1896, after being re-elected in 1892. After the Dreyfus affair of 1894–1906, he abandoned politics and returned to practising the Law.

== Personal life ==
On 6 September 1882, he married Esther Baze in Avignon. They had two children:

- Samuel Élie Paul Abram (1883-unknown).
- Maurice David Joseph Abram (1887-unknown).

== Death ==
He died on 30 April 1938 in Aix-en-Provence.

== Legacy ==
The Avenue Benjamin Abram in Aix-en-Provence is named in his honour.

Political offices
Preceded by François Mandin	Mayor of Aix-en-Provence; 1888-1896	Succeeded by Gabriel Baron
