= Jean-Baptiste-Boniface de Fortis =

- Born: June 19, 1763; Aix-en-Provence
- Died: September 12, 1848 (aged 85); Aix-en-Provence
- Occupation: Politician
- Spouse: Gabrielle Françoise d'André de Bellevue
- Parent(s): François-Boniface de Fortis; Marie-Marguerite Désirée de Moricaud Soleilhas

Jean-Baptiste-Boniface de Fortis (1763–1848) was a French politician. After serving in the Parlement of Aix-en-Provence during the Ancien Régime, he was exiled during the French Revolution and later returned to France, where he served as the Mayor of Aix-en-Provence from 1806 to 1808 and from 1809 to 1811.

== Biography ==
=== Early life ===
Jean-Baptiste-Boniface de Fortis was born on June 19, 1763, in Aix-en-Provence. He was baptised in the Église de la Madeleine a day later. His father was François-Boniface de Fortis and his mother, Marie-Marguerite Désirée de Moricaud Soleilhas.

=== Career ===
From 1782 to 1798, during the Ancien Régime, he served as an Advisor in the Parlement of Aix-en-Provence, a position he had inherited from his father. In 1790, during the French Revolution, he left France to avoid being guillotined. When he returned in 1801, he was appointed as Head of hospices in Aix. He was also in charge of taking care of children who had been orphaned as a result of the French Revolution. He then served as the Mayor of Aix-en-Provence from 1806 to 1808 and from 1809 to 1811.

In 1814, he was appointed as Secretary General of the Prefecture of the Seine in Paris. He became a Knight of the Legion of Honour in 1814, and finally an Officer in 1821, for his public service.

=== Personal life ===
On August 19, 1788, he married Gabrielle Françoise d'André de Bellevue, daughter of Jacques Joseph Gabriel Benoît and Anne Jeanne Françoise Payan de Saint-Martin, in the Église de la Madeleine. They resided at number 7 on the rue des Trois-Ormeaux in Aix. They had four children:

- Gabrielle de Fortis (1790-1868).
- Antoine Boniface Victor de Fortis (1791-1792).
- Marie Julie Joséphine de Fortis (1791-1880).
- Boniface François de Fortis (1799-1879).
- Désirée Joséphine Maxime de Fortis (1803-1803).

He died on September 12, 1848, in Aix-en-Provence.

Political offices
Preceded by Antoine Alexis	Mayor of Aix-en-Provence; 1806–1808	Succeeded by Alexandre de Fauris de Saint-Vincens
Preceded by Alexandre de Fauris de Saint-Vincens	Mayor of Aix-en-Provence; 1809–1811	Succeeded by Jean-Baptiste Paul Gras
