= Maurizio Porfiri =

Italian electrical engineer, researcher

- Education: Virginia Polytechnic Institute, Sapienza University of Rome, University of Toulon
- Occupations: Institute Professor; Director of the Center for Urban Science and Progress at NYU Tandon
- Organization: New York University Tandon School of Engineering
- Title: Ph.D.
- Website: wp.nyu.edu/dsl

Maurizio Porfiri (born Rome, Italy) is an engineering professor, mostly noted for his work with robotic fish and aquatic research. His research revolves around modeling and control of complex systems, with applications from mechanics to behavior, public health, and robotics. He is an Institute Professor of Mechanical and Aerospace Engineering and Biomedical Engineering at the New York University Tandon School of Engineering. He is also part of the core faculty of New York University's Center for Urban Science and Progress. In 2022, he was appointed the director of the Center for Urban Science and Progress.

As of 2023, Porfiri has authored approximately 400 journal publications, including papers in Nature, Nature Human Behaviour, and Physical Review Letters.

== Education ==
Porfiri earned his Ph.D. in engineering mechanics from Virginia Polytechnic Institute. He also holds a Ph.D. in theoretical and applied mechanics from Sapienza University of Rome and the University of Toulon.

== Career and honors ==
Porfiri is an Institute Professor at New York University Tandon School of Engineering, with appointments at the Mechanical and Aerospace Engineering department, the Biomedical Engineering department, and the Center for Urban Science and Progress.

He is the founder and the director of the Dynamical Systems Laboratory which conducts research of modeling and control of complex dynamical systems with a developed expertise in biomimetics and underwater applications.

In 2008, Porfiri won the National Science Foundation Faculty Early Career Development (CAREER) Award from the dynamical systems division. Popular Science listed Porfiri in their "Brilliant 10" in 2010. In 2013, he was named the ASME Dynamic Systems and Controls Division Outstanding Young Investigator for his contributions to biomimetic underwater robotics and collective dynamics of networked dynamical systems. He earned the ASME Gary Anderson Early Achievement Award that same year. In 2015, he won the ASME C.D. Mote, Jr. Early Career Award. Porfiri was elevated to Fellow by the ASME and of the IEEE, both in 2019.

He is an alumnus of the U.S. Frontiers of Engineering Symposium, organized by the National Academy of Engineering, and the World Laureates Forum.

== Research ==
Porfiri's interdisciplinary research spans across animal and human behavior, control and dynamical systems theory, experimental and theoretical mechanics, network science, and robotics.

Porfiri and his team at the New York University Tandon School of Engineering have designed bio-inspired robotic fish to determine whether they could act as leaders to real fish. The robotic models provide predictable, controllable stimuli alongside live animals which is repeatable and consistent. Porfiri has shown that the tail movement of a robotic fish can influence whether or not a zebrafish will accept the robot as a leader. A school of Golden shiner followed the robotic fish in school-like positions in a water tunnel experiment, even though the robot is bigger than the fish and not the same color. The goal is to lead live fish away from dangerous areas including oil or chemical spill and natural disasters. The research was funded by a NSF Faculty Early Career Development (CAREER) Award.

Porfiri has conducted experiments with robotic replicas which evoke fear responses in zebrafish, and worked with the connection between alcohol and social behavior, finding that alcohol reduces fear in zebrafish. He led a team from both the New York University Tandon School of Engineering and the University of Illinois at Urbana-Champaign which found that female killifish prefer males with yellow fins.

In 2015, Porfiri's research in the directional information flow underlying collective animal behavior was paired with education and outreach activities in Brooklyn public schools.

In recent years, Porfiri and his team developed robots that can contribute to mitigating the threat of invasive fish species by simulating natural predators. To isolate the determinants of social interactions in fish, he and his team designed a platform that can “teleport” the behavior of fish on a fish replica in real-time.

In 2012, Porfiri used robotic rovers to explore the Gowanus Canal in an attempt to learn how the toxic water affects wildlife. He founded the citizen science platform Brooklyn Atlantis, which engaged local communities in the environmental monitoring and control of the polluted waters of the Gowanus Canal. The research was funded by the National Science Foundation.

Since 2019, Porfiri has been involved in research in the area of firearm acquisition and violence in the United States. Leading a multidisciplinary team across four universities, he demonstrated that spikes in gun purchases in the aftermath of a mass shooting are associated with the fear that gun access will be soon curtailed by restrictive laws, rather than the desire of self-protection. The research is now under the support of the National Science Foundation, in one of the first firearm-related funded grants since the Dickey Amendment in 1996.

Porfiri and his team have been working on the mathematical modeling of epidemiological diffusion since 2016. With the advent of the COVID-19 pandemic, he leveraged network theory and high power computing to study the effect of non-pharmaceutical interventions, vaccinations, and reopenings on the spread of the virus.

In 2021, he was part of the research team that demonstrated the efficiency of the skeletal motifs of the deep-sea sponge Venus' flower basket, in terms of reduction of drag and of trapping time of fluid inside the body cavity, which is likely to promote selective filter feeding and sexual reproduction.

== Selected bibliography ==
=== Journal articles ===
- Boldini, A., Porfiri M., 2021: “Inversion of solvent migration in charged membranes”, Physical Review Letters 127(15), 156001
- Falcucci, G., Amati, G., Fanelli, P., Krastev, V. K., Polverino, G., Porfiri, M., Succi, S., 2021: “Extreme flow simulations reveal skeletal adaptations of deep-sea sponges”, Nature 595, 537–541
- Porfiri, M., 2020: "Validity and limitations of the detection matrix to determine hidden units and network size from perceptible dynamics", Physical Review Letters 124(16), 168301
- Porfiri, M., Sattanapalle, R. R., Nakayama, S., Macinko, J., Sipahi, R., 2019: "Media coverage and firearm acquisition in the aftermath of a mass shooting", Nature Human Behaviour 3(9), 913-921
- Zhang, P., Rosen, M., Peterson, S. D., Porfiri, M., 2018: "An information-theoretic approach to study fluid-structure interactions", Journal of Fluid Mechanics 848, 968-986
- Golovneva, O., Jeter, R., Belykh, I., Porfiri, M., 2017: "Windows of opportunity for synchronization in stochastically coupled maps", Physica D: Nonlinear Phenomena 340, 1-13
- Zino, L., Rizzo, A., Porfiri, M., 2016: "Continuous-time discrete-distribution theory for activity-driven networks", Physical Review Letters 117(22), 228302
- Mwaffo, V., Anderson, R. P., Butail, S., Porfiri, M., 2015: "A jump persistent turning walker to model zebrafish locomotion", Journal of the Royal Society Interface 12(102), 20140884
- Cha, Y., Porfiri, M., 2014: "Mechanics and electrochemistry of ionic polymer metal composites", Journal of the Mechanics and Physics of Solids 71, 156–178
- Panciroli, R., Porfiri, M., 2013: "Evaluation of the pressure field on a rigid body entering a quiescent fluid through particle image velocimetry", Experiments in Fluids 54(12), 1630
- Marras, S., Porfiri, M., 2012: "Fish and robots swimming together: attraction towards the robot demands biomimetic locomotion", Journal of the Royal Society Interface 9(73), 1856–1868
- Abaid, N., Porfiri, M., 2011: "Consensus over numerosity-constrained random networks", IEEE Transactions on Automatic Control 56(3), 649-654
- Aureli, M., Kopman, V., Porfiri, M., 2010: "Free-locomotion of underwater vehicles actuated by ionic polymer metal composites", IEEE/ASME Transactions on Mechatronics 15(4), 603-614
