= Salomon Bédarrides =

- Born: 18 February 1809; Aix-en-Provence, France
- Died: 29 September 1886 (aged 77); Aix-en-Provence, France
- Occupations: Lawyer; Politician
- Relatives: Jassuda Bédarrides (brother); Benjamin Abram (nephew)

Salomon Bédarrides (1809–1886) was a French lawyer and politician. He served as the mayor of Aix-en-Provence from 1877 to 1884.

== Biography ==
=== Early life ===
Salomon Bédarrides was born in a Jewish family on 18 February 1809 in Aix-en-Provence. His brother, Jassuda Bédarrides (1804-1882), served as the mayor of Aix from 1858 to 1859.

=== Career ===
He started his career as a lawyer in Aix.

A supporter of the Republic, he decided to follow in his brother's footsteps and embark upon a career in politics. He was left-wing, and a Freemason. He was elected to the town council in 1870. He served as the mayor of Aix-en-Provence from 1877 to 1884. As such, he was the second Jewish Mayor of this city, the first being his brother. One of his first decisions, taken on 8 November 1876, was to rename the Cours Mirabeau as such. He reduced the debt the town has incurred and purchased more books for the public library. He commissioned the destruction of the Rue des Cardeurs and vowed to improve the lives of the poor in the town. He also commissioned the construction of the Lycée Mignet, a secondary school.

He received the Knighthood of the Legion of Honour on 12 August 1880.

=== Personal life ===
He resided at number 9 on the rue Beauvezet in Aix.

=== Death ===
He died on 29 September 1886 in Aix-en-Provence.

=== Legacy ===
The Rue Bédarrides in Aix-en-Provence is named in his honour and his brother's.

Political offices
Preceded by Eugène de Mougins de Roquefort	Mayor of Aix-en-Provence; 1877-1884	Succeeded by Henri Tassy
