= Félix Ciccolini =

French politician

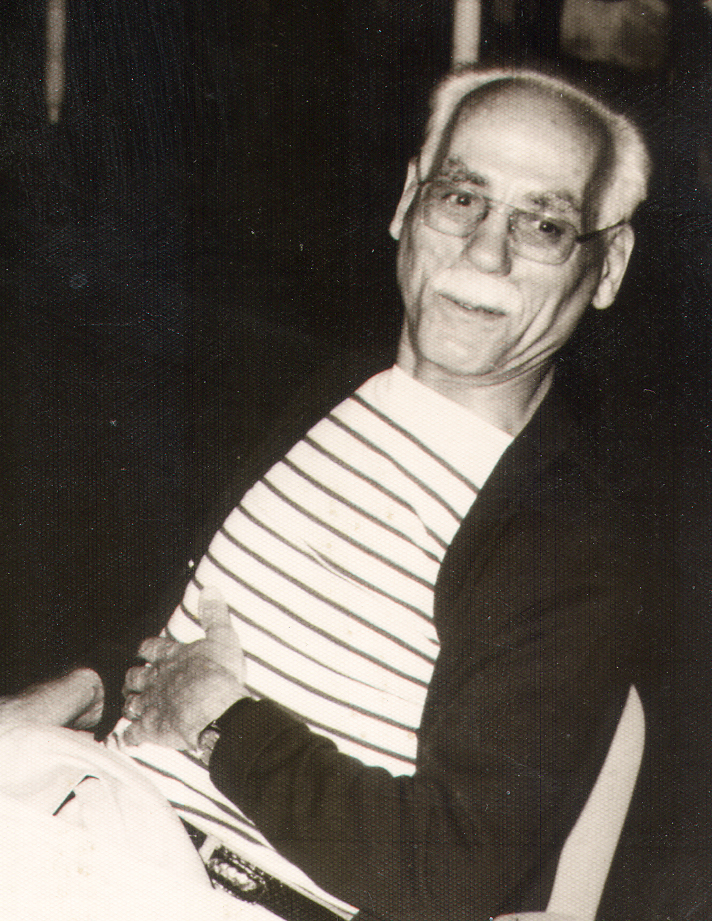

Mayor of Aix-en-Provence
- In office 1967–1978
- Preceded by: Henri Mouret
- Succeeded by: Alain Joissains

Personal details
- Born: 2 October 1916 Cozzano, Corsica, France
- Died: 1 May 2010 (aged 93) Ajaccio, France
- Party: Socialist Party
- Profession: Lawyer

Félix Ciccolini (1916–2010) was a French politician. He was the mayor of Aix-en-Provence from 1967 to 1978 and a member of the Senate of France for the Bouches-du-Rhône from 1971 to 1989.

== Biography ==
=== Early life ===
Félix Ciccolini was born on 2 October 1916 in Cozzano, Corsica. He studied law.

=== Career ===
He started working as a lawyer in Aix-en-Provence in 1938.

He joined the French Section of the Workers' International and later the Socialist Party. He became a city councillor of Aix in 1953. From 1964 to 1988, he served on the general council of Aix-Nord.

He was mayor of Aix-en-Provence from 1967 to 1978. During his tenure, he oversaw the growth of the town, due in large part to the return to the homeland of former inhabitants of colonial French Algeria and the harkis after the independence of Algeria. For example, he commissioned the construction of a new neighbourhood, the Jas de Bouffan, where 12,000 new inhabitants moved in the 1970s, and another neighbourhood, closer to the city centre, called Encagnane.

Additionally, he was a senator for the Bouches-du-Rhône from 1971 to 1989. He called for an increase in prison staff. He supported the repeal of the death penalty in 1981. He denounced the Office de Radiodiffusion Télévision Française for being too monopolistic and thus a threat to democracy, and called for a plurality of radio and television media. On 13 February 1979, he sent an open letter to Jean François-Poncet (1928–2012), the French Minister of Foreign Affairs, to ask him to call for a release of French citizens who were kidnapped in Algeria shortly after the Évian Accords of 1962. Moreover, he voted in favour of lowering the age of majority from 21 to 18 in 1974, the legalization of abortion in 1975, and a reform to facilitate divorce, also in 1975.

Even though he supported Gaston Defferre (1910–1986), he voted for Valéry Giscard d'Estaing in 1974.

In 1996, he wrote a book about the village where he was born, Cozzano.

=== Personal life ===
He died on 1 May 2010 in Ajaccio, Corsica. He was buried in the family plot of the Cozzano cemetery.

== Bibliography ==
- Félix Ciccolini, Histoire de Cozzano: 1800–1935: Le Haut-Taravo (A. Piazzola, 1996, 263 pages).

== See also ==
- List of mayors of Aix-en-Provence

Political offices
Preceded by Henri Mouret	Mayor of Aix-en-Provence; 1967–1978	Succeeded by Alain Joissains
