= Gabriel Baron =

French lawyer and politician

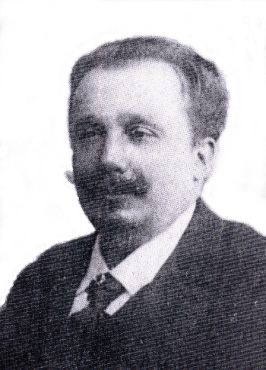
- Born: 23 December 1859; Marseille, France
- Died: 22 October 1928 (aged 68); Cannes, France
- Occupation: Politician

Gabriel Baron (23 December 1859 – 22 October 1928) was a French lawyer and politician. He served as the Mayor of Aix-en-Provence in 1896, and as a member of the National Assembly of France from 1897 to 1898, from 1902 to 1906, and from 1906 to 1910.

== Biography ==
=== Early life ===
Gabriel Baron was born on 23 December 1859 in Marseille, Alpes-Maritimes department. He studied Law.

=== Career ===
He started his working life as a lawyer. He decided to embark upon a career in politics. He was elected to the General Council in 1895 and later served as the mayor of Aix-en-Provence from 1896 to 1897.

Interested in gaining national clout, he ran in the legislative election of 1897, and won. He went on to serve as a member of the National Assembly for the Bouches-du-Rhône three times: from 14 March 1897 to 31 May 1898, from 11 May 1902 to 31 May 1906 and finally from 6 May 1906 to 31 May 1910. He was an Independent Socialist.

=== Death ===
He died on 22 October 1928 in Cannes, Alpes-Maritimes department.

Political offices
Preceded by Benjamin Abram	Mayor of Aix-en-Provence; 1896–1897	Succeeded by Maurice Bertrand
