= University of Toulon =

University in Toulon, France

Coordinates: 43°08′10″N 6°01′10″E

- Université de Toulon
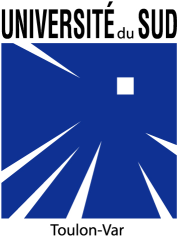
- Type: Public
- President: Xavier LEROUX
- Students: 10,000
- Location: Toulon, France
- Website: (in French)

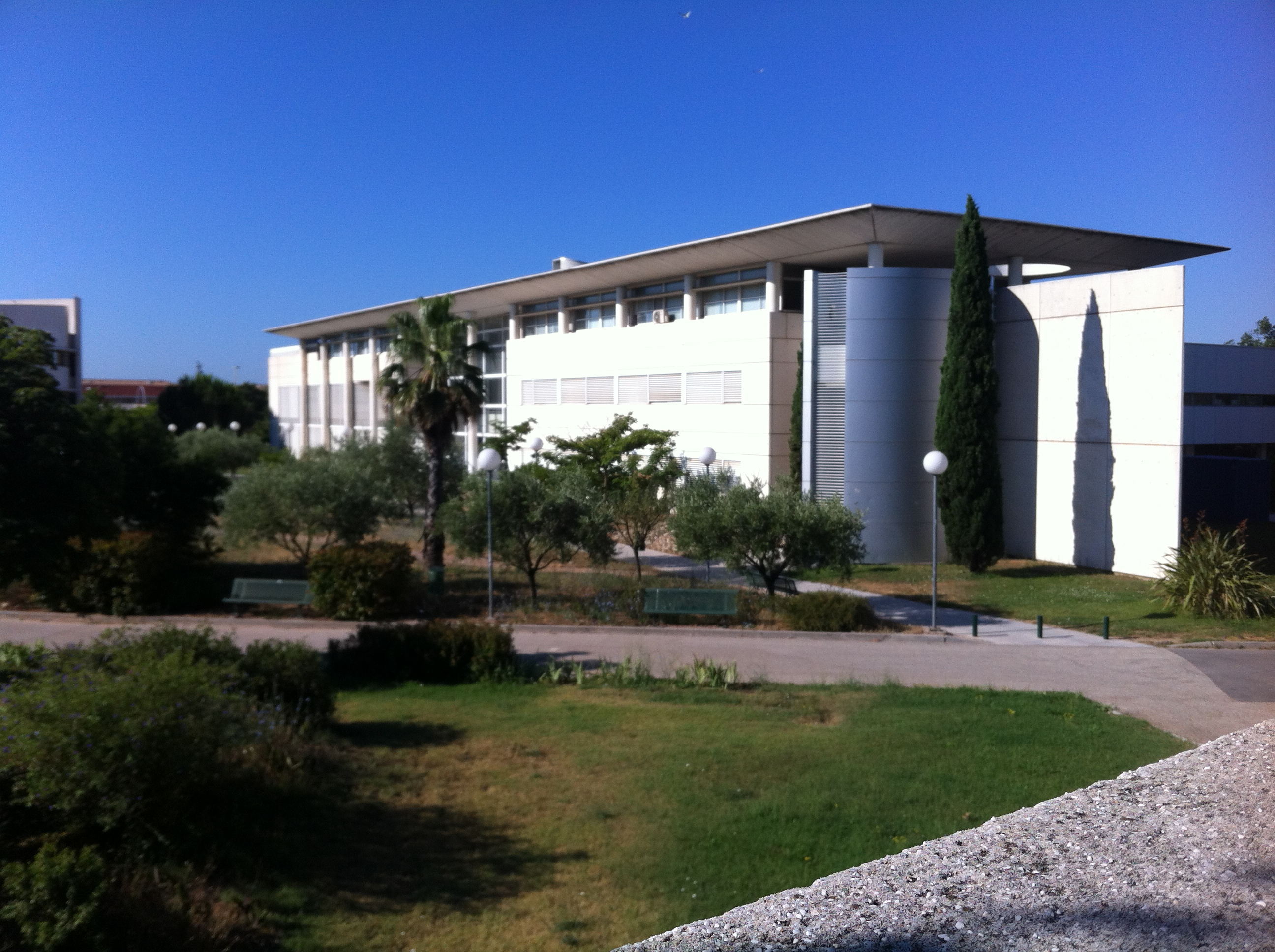
One of the buildings of the University

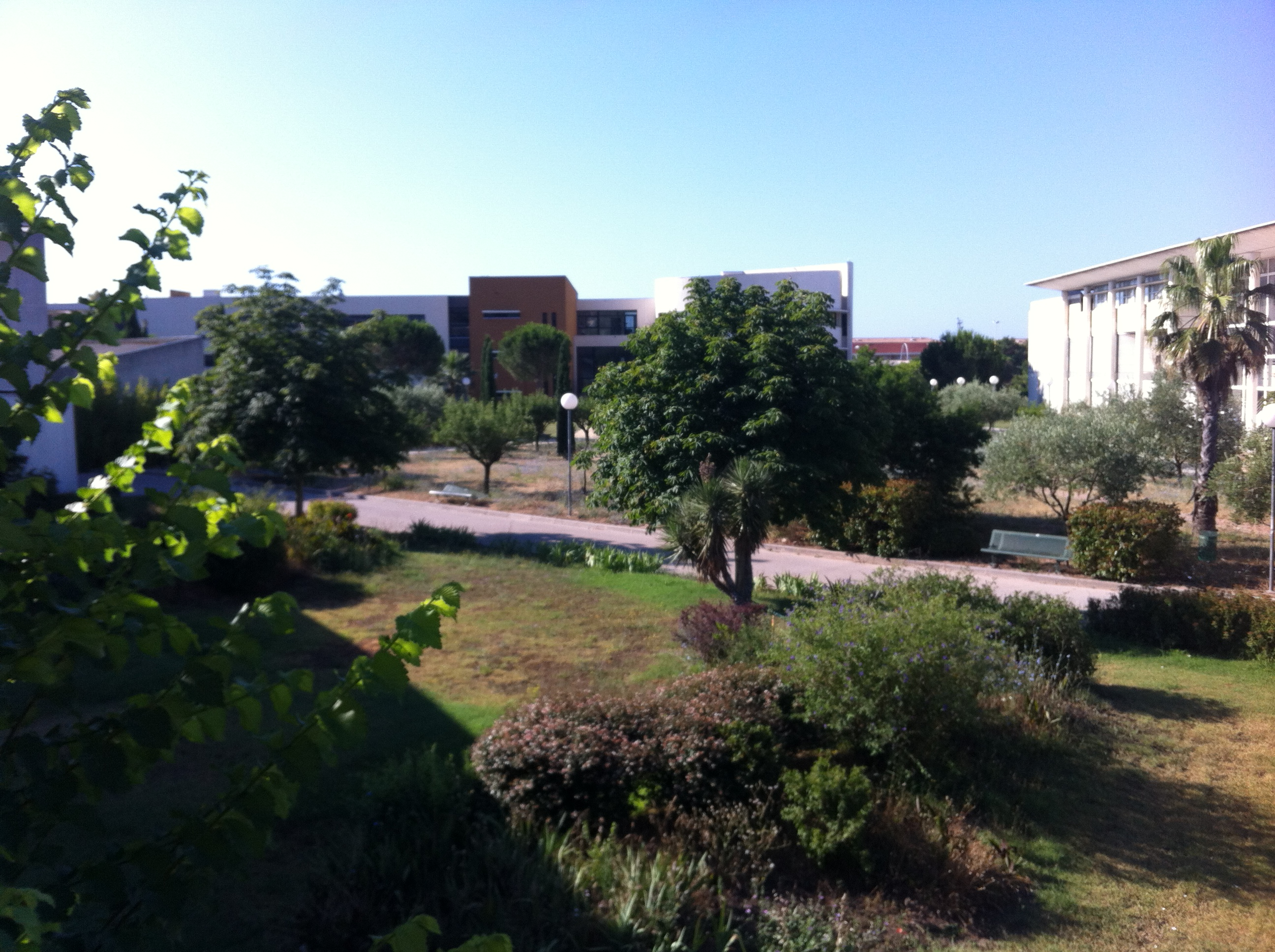
A view of the campus

The University of Toulon (French: Université de Toulon or UTLN) is a French university located in Toulon, France, and neighboring areas (La Garde, Saint-Raphaël, La Valette and Draguignan). It was founded in 1968 and is organized in 6 faculties, 2 autonomous institutes, an institute of business management and an engineering school.

== Unités de Formation et de Recherche ==
In the French system, an UFR ("Unité de formation et de recherche") or Research and Education Unit offers both undergraduate and graduate programs. Each UFR is governed by a director elected from the department and heads over a council of elected professors who control its curriculum.

The University of Toulon has 6 U.F.R.:

- Science (UFR Sciences et Techniques)
  - Undergraduate level: Mathematics, Applied Mathematics, Biology, Computer Science and Physics/Chemistry.
  - Graduate level: Mathematics, Computer Science, Physics and Engineering Science, Chemistry.
- Arts (UFR Lettres et Sciences Humaines)
  - French, English (Language, Literature and History or "Langues, Littérature et Civilisation"), Spanish, applied Modern Languages ("Langues Etrangères Appliquées").
  - Tourism ("Management de projets touristiques durables") and Culture ("Management de projets artistiques et culturels").
- Law (UFR de Droit)
- Economy (UFR Sciences Economiques et de Gestion)
- Sport (UFR STAPS)
- Multimedia (Institut Ingémédia)

== Institutes and Schools ==
- Engineering School: Institut des Sciences de l'Ingénieur de Toulon et du Var (ISITV, now Seatech)
- Business School: Institut d'Administration des Entreprises

== University Institutes for Technology ==
- IUT de Toulon
- IUT de Saint-Raphaël

== Research Centers ==
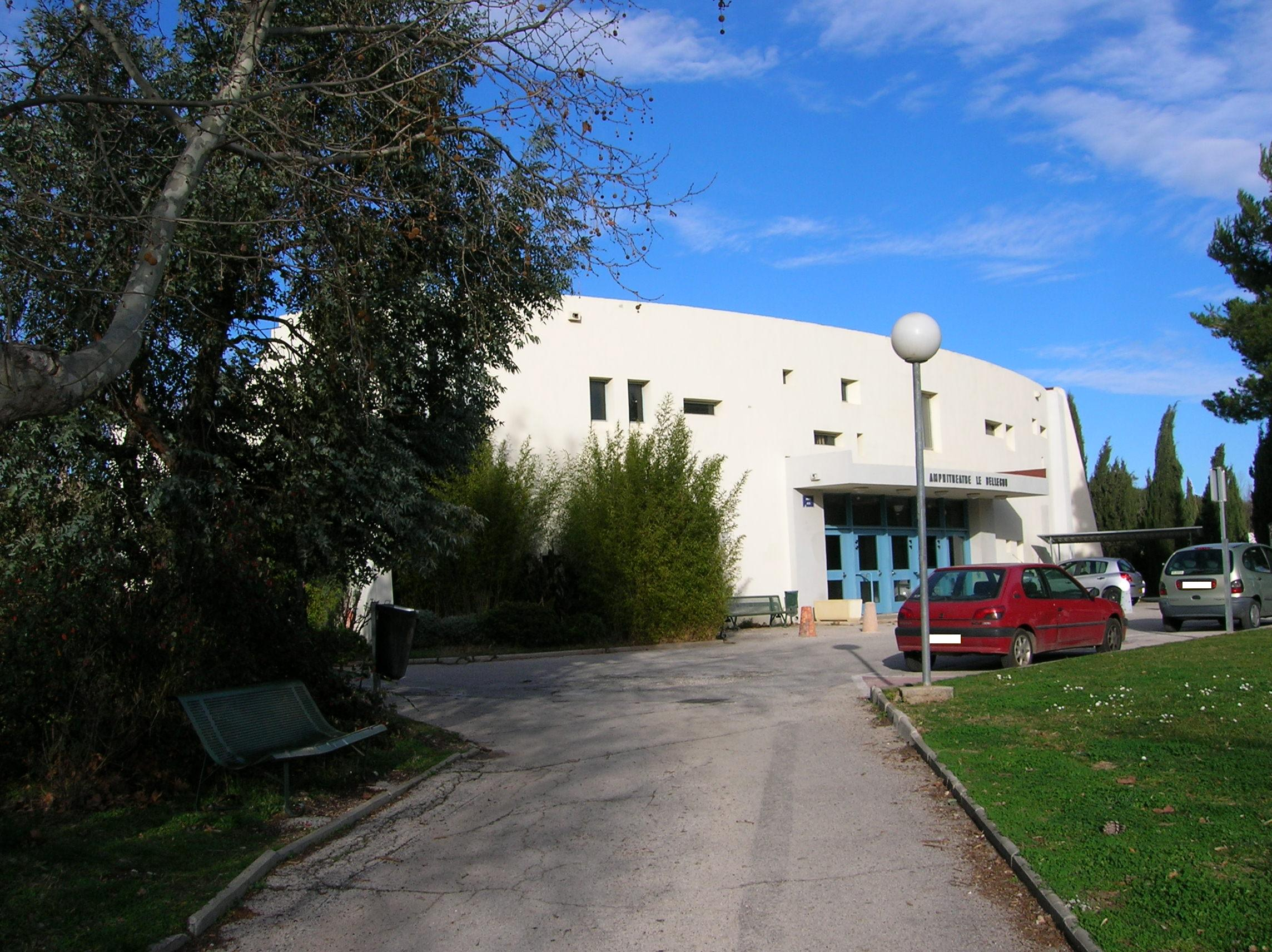
Another view of the campus

Mathematics

- IMATH – Institut de Mathématiques de Toulon

Earth Science

- LSEET – Laboratoire de Sondages Electromagnétiques de l'Environnement Terrestre – UMR 6017
- PROTEE – Processus de Transferts et d'Echanges dans l'Environnement

Physics and Chemistry

- MAPIEM – Matériaux Polymères Interfaces Environnement Marin (EA 4323 MAPIEM)
- IM2NP – Institut Matériaux Microélectronique Nanosciences de Provence – UMR CNRS 6242

Physics and Engineering

- CPT – Centre de Physique Théorique – UMR 6207 (jointly with Aix-Marseille University and the CNRS)

Humanities

- BABEL – Laboratoire Babel
- i3M – Information, Milieux, Médias, Médiations

Political Science and Law

- CDPC JEAN-CLAUDE ESCARRAS – Centre de Droit et de Politique Comparés – UMR CNRS 6201
- CERC – Centre d'Etudes et de Recherche sur les Contentieux

Economics

- ERMMES – Laboratoire d'Etudes et de Recherche Méditerranéennes en Management des Entreprises
- LEAD – Laboratoire d'Économie Appliquée au Développement

Health and Biology

- HANDIBIO : Laboratoire de Biomodélisation et ingénierie des handicaps

Communication Science

- LSIS – Laboratoire des Sciences de l'Information et des systèmes

Engineering

- SNC – Systèmes Navals Complexes – ERTA

== Notable people ==
Faculty

- Boris Cyrulnik (born 1937, in Bordeaux) – psychiatrist
- Olivier Dubuquoy (born 1974) – geographer, documentarist and environmental activist
- Fabien Matras (born 1984) – lawyer; politician

Alumni

- Maryse Joissains (born 1942, in Toulin) – politician (LR)
- Gearóid Ó hAllmhuráin (born 1955) – Irish ethnomusicologist, author, musician and historian specialising in Irish music, diaspora, cultural and memory studies
- Maurizio Porfiri (born Rome, Italy) – engineering professor, noted for his work with robotic fish and aquatic research
- Sonia Krimi (born 1982, in Tunis) – politician (LREM)

== See also ==
- List of public universities in France by academy
