= Center for Urban Science and Progress =

New York University research institute

Coordinates: 40°41′35″N 73°59′14″W

New York University Center for Urban Science and Progress
- Type: Private
- Established: September 2013; 13 years ago
- Parent institution: New York University
- Director: Maurizio Porfiri
- Postgraduates: 81
- Location: Brooklyn, New York, United States
- Campus: Urban
- Website: engineering.nyu.edu/research/centers/cusp

The NYU Center for Urban Science and Progress (commonly referred to as CUSP) is a degree-granting technology and research institute in downtown Brooklyn, New York City. It is a graduate school of New York University focusing on urban informatics. The Center, first opened in September 2013, is inside NYU's 370 Jay Street building.

== History and background ==
In July 2011, Mayor Michael Bloomberg issued a request for proposals to all universities worldwide to build an engineering and applied sciences campus in New York City. The winner(s) of the competition would receive significant funding from the city in order to build the campus. NYU submitted a proposal to build a school of applied urban science in downtown Brooklyn in an underused MTA building, with the aim of confronting the world's pressing urban challenges. The proposal was declared the second winner in April 2012 by Mayor Bloomberg after negotiations with city government and the MTA. During the celebration ceremony, Steve Koonin was named as the director of CUSP.

== Campus ==
CUSP is located at 370 Jay Street in a 460,000 square feet (42,735 m^{2}) building along with other academic units of NYU. The current campus opened in 2017 and was the first tenant in the newly-renovated building. NYU originally established CUSP in leased space in MetroTech and classes first began in September 2013.

== Academics ==
CUSP teaches the principles and scientific investigative tools and techniques to interrogate and combine city datasets to tackle real urban challenges. Subjects developed for CUSP's curricula include urban engineering, civil engineering, computer science, and electrical engineering. Besides students accepted directly to CUSP, graduate students from other schools of NYU will be invited to study at CUSP, as well as students from CUSP's partner universities, which include Carnegie Mellon University, CUNY, The Indian Institute of Technology - Bombay, The University of Toronto, King's College London, and The University of Warwick. CUSP will also have industry partners to assist with research, which include IBM, Cisco, Siemens, Con Edison, National Grid, Xerox, Arup, IDEO, and AECOM.

CUSP offers a M.S. degree in Applied Urban Science and Informatics, and an Advanced Graduate Certificate program. The M.S. program also has a track in Civil Analytics, and an extended (2 year) form to allow students to meet full-time degree requirements on a part-time basis.

CUSP's inaugural class of 23 students was inducted on August 26, 2013, and graduated in July 2014. CUSP's second cohort of 64 students graduated in July 2015. The class of 2016 had 89 students.

CUSP sponsored and contributed to "Big Data, Privacy, and the Public Good: Frameworks for Engagement", a pioneering book on the intersection of big data, privacy and the public.

== Research ==
Since its inception, CUSP has been engaged in a range of research projects across transportation, energy, pollution, waste management, light and sound pollution, including:

- New York's first comprehensive study of its largest buildings' energy use
- The creation of Urban Observatory sites in Brooklyn to measure energy emissions, extreme event detection and management as well as pollution tracking. The observatory began collection data as of December 2013
- The Sounds of New York City (SONYC), a project which studies and creates technological solutions for noise problems
- Quantified Community, and urban informatics sensing project for a mixed-use building in midtown Manhattan
- Citizen Science: A project set to engage the public in widespread city data collection
