= Jean-François Picheral =

French politician (1934–2024)

- Born: 26 February 1934; Nîmes, France
- Died: 12 October 2024 (aged 90)
- Occupations: Radiologist; Politician
- Political party: Socialist Party
- Relatives: Gaston Defferre

Jean-François Picheral (26 February 1934 – 12 October 2024) was a French Socialist politician. He served as Mayor of Aix-en-Provence from 1989 to 2001, and French Senator from 1998 to 2008.

== Biography ==
Picheral was born on 26 February 1934. He was a distant cousin of Gaston Defferre (1910–1986), who served as a Socialist French Senator from 1959 to 1962, and as Mayor of Marseille from 1953 to 1986.

He worked as a radiologist.

A socialist, he served as Mayor of Aix-en-Provence from 1989 to 2001, and as French Senator from 1998 to 2008.

Picheral died on 12 October 2024, at the age of 90.

Political offices
Preceded by Jean-Pierre de Peretti Della Rocca	Mayor of Aix-en-Provence; 1989–2001	Succeeded by Maryse Joissains-Masini
