= Henri Coquand =

French geologist and paleontologist

Henri Coquand (1813 in Aix-en-Provence – 1881 in Marseille) was a French geologist and paleontologist.

In 1841 he obtained his doctorate in sciences in Paris, and later served as a professor of geology at the University of Besançon, Poitiers and Marseille.

From his geological studies of southwestern France, he introduced the Upper Cretaceous stages: Coniacian, Santonian and Campanian (1857). In 1871 he proposed the Berriasian stage of the Lower Cretaceous, named after Berrias, a town in the department of Ardèche. He also conducted geological / paleontological research in Spain, Algeria and Morocco.

In 1838 he founded the Muséum d'Aix in Aix-en-Provence. From 1862 to 1870 he was a correspondent member of the Comité des travaux historiques et scientifiques, and from 1871 to 1881, he was a munincipal councillor in Marseille.

The mineral coquandite commemorates his name; its chemical formula is Sb_{6}O_{8}(SO_{4})•(H_{2}O).

== Selected works ==
- Traité des roches considérées au point de vue de leur origine et de leur composition, 1856 – Treatises on rocks considered from the point of view of their origins and compositions.
- Description physique, géologique, paléontologique et minéralogique du département de la Charente, 1856 – Physical, geological, paleontological and mineralogical descriptions of the department of Charente.
- Géologie et paléontologie de la région sud de la province de Constantine, 1862 – Geology and paleontology of the region south of Constantine Province.
- Description géologique de la Province de Constantine, 1864 – Geological description of Constantine Province.
- Monographie de l'étage aptien de l'Espagne, 1865 – Monograph on the Aptian stage of Spain.
- Monographie du genre Ostrea. Terrain Crétacé, 1869 – Monograph on the genus Ostrea, Cretaceous terrain.
