= Jean-Pierre de Peretti Della Rocca =

French Politician

- Born: 26 June 1930; Lausanne, Switzerland
- Died: 8 October 2001 (aged 71); Tours, France
- Occupation: Politician

Jean-Pierre de Peretti Della Rocca (26 June 1930; Switzerland – 8 October 2001, Tours, France) was a Swiss-born French Union for French Democracy politician. He served as Mayor of Aix-en-Provence from 1983 to 1989, and as a member of the National Assembly of France for the 14th district encompassing the Bouches-du-Rhône from 1986 to 1993.

== Biography ==
=== Early life ===
He was born on 26 June 1930 in Lausanne, Switzerland. He worked as a general practitioner and wrote a book about the French parliament.

=== Political career ===
He served as Mayor of Aix-en-Provence from 1983 to 1989. During city council meetings, he sang the Copa Santa, the official anthem of Provence. He was initially an ally of Alain Joissains, who served as Mayor from 1978 to 1983, but he did not support his wife, who currently serves as Mayor.

Subsequently, he served as member of the French Assembly for the 14th district from 1986 to 1993.

=== Death ===
He died in Tours in 2001.

== Bibliography ==
- L'Antigénothérapie spécifique par voie intradermique dans le traitement des staphyloccies rebelles et récidivantes (1956)

Political offices
Preceded by Alain Joissains	Mayor of Aix-en-Provence; 1983-1989	Succeeded by Jean-François Picheral
