= Sophie Joissains =

French politician

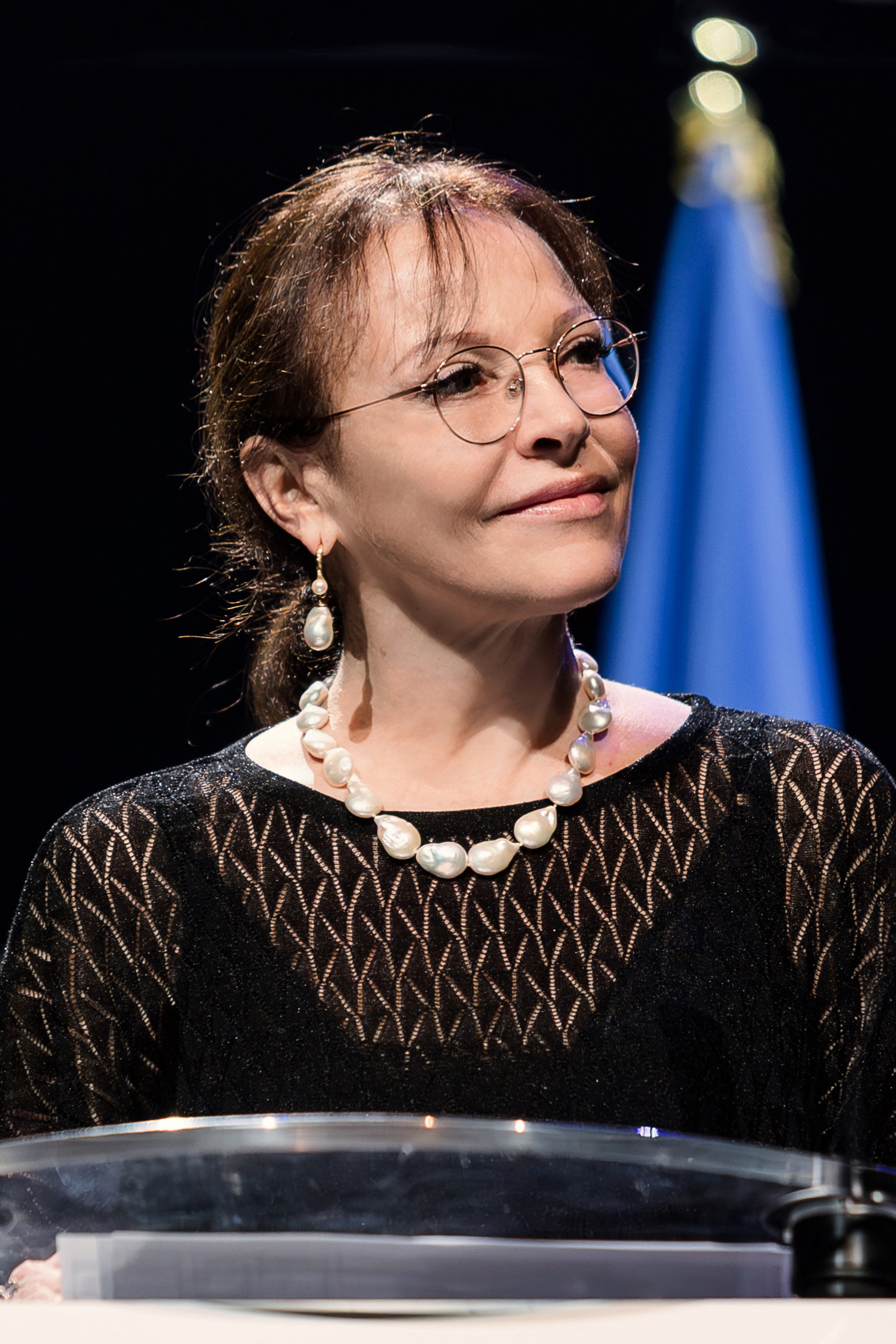
- Sophie Joissains in 2024

Mayor of Aix-en-Provence
- Incumbent
- Assumed office 24 September 2021
- Preceded by: Maryse Joissains

Member of the French Senate for Bouches-du-Rhône
- In office 1 October 2008 – 2 August 2020
- Succeeded by: Patrick Boré

Personal details
- Born: 25 October 1969 (age 56) Aix-en-Provence, France
- Party: UDI; Radical Party
- Parent(s): Alain Joissains; Maryse Joissains-Masini
- Education: Aix-Marseille University
- Profession: Jurist

Sophie Joissains (born 25 October 1969) is a French politician who has served as Mayor of Aix en Provence since 2021. She was previously a member of the French Senate. She represents the Bouches-du-Rhône department and is a member of the Radical Party.

== Early life ==
Sophie Joissains was born on 25 October 1969 to Alain Joissains, mayor of Aix-en-Provence from 1978 to 1983, and Maryse Joissains-Masini, also mayor since 2001. To study the Law, she moved to Paris, then Louvain, and she eventually received a Master of Advanced Studies. She also worked in cinema for Anatole Dauman, and started a career as a criminologist.

== Career ==
In 2008, she became the youngest female member of the French Senate. She served as the deputy mayor of Aix-en-Provence between 2020 and 2021 and was subsequently elected mayor on 24 September 2021. She has been accused of nepotism.

She supports the HADOPI law. Alongside Claude Domeizel, she has proposed a bank holiday to celebrate laïcité.

== Personal life ==
She is a cancer survivor.

Political offices
Preceded by Maryse Joissains	Mayor of Aix-en-Provence; 2021–present	Succeeded by Incumbent
