= Cozzano =

Commune in Corsica, France

- Commune
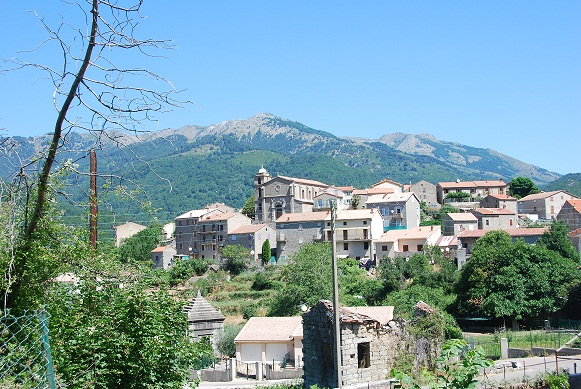
- A view of the village of Cozzano
- Location of Cozzano
- Location within France Location within Corsica
- Coordinates: 41°56′07″N 9°09′19″E
- Country: France
- Region: Corsica
- Department: Corse-du-Sud
- Arrondissement: Ajaccio
- Canton: Taravo-Ornano

Government
  - Mayor (2020–2026): Jean-Jacques Ciccolini
- Area^{1}: 25.59 km^{2} (9.88 sq mi)
- Elevation: 700 m (2,300 ft)
- Highest elevation: 1,981 m (6,499 ft)
- Lowest elevation: 571 m (1,873 ft)
- Population (2023): 282
  - Density: 11.0/km^{2} (28.5/sq mi)
- Time zone: UTC+01:00 (CET)
  - Summer (DST): UTC+02:00 (CEST)
- INSEE/Postal code: 2A099 /20148
- ^{1} French Land Register data, which excludes lakes, ponds, glaciers > 1 km^{2} (0.386 sq mi or 247 acres) and river estuaries.

Cozzano (French pronunciation: [kotsano]; Corsican: Cuzzà) is a commune in the Corse-du-Sud department of France on the island of Corsica.

== Population ==
Historical population
Year	Pop.	±% p.a.
1968	476	—
1975	414	−1.97%
1982	319	−3.66%
1990	283	−1.49%
1999	242	−1.72%
2007	258	+0.80%
2012	282	+1.79%
2017	273	−0.65%
2023	282	+0.54%
Source: INSEE

== See also ==
- Communes of the Corse-du-Sud department
