= Councils of Aix-en-Provence =

Councils of the Roman Catholic Church were held at Aix-en-Provence in 1112, 1374, 1409, 1585, 1612, 1838,^{(fr)} and 1850. In that of 1612 the Gallican work of Edmond Richer, De la puissance ecclésiastique et politique (Paris, 1611), was censured.

In that of 1838 the attendees requested Pope Gregory XVI to add "Immaculate" to the word "Conception" in the preface of the Mass for the Feast of the Immaculate Conception, which he did.
