= Toussaint-Bernard Émeric-David =

French archaeologist and writer

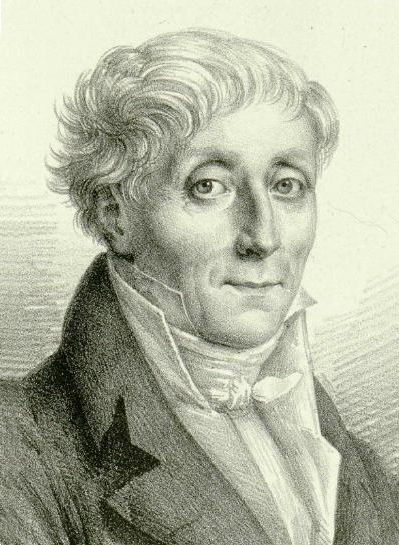
- Born: 20 August 1755; Aix-en-Provence
- Died: 2 April 1839 (aged 83); Paris
- Occupation: archaeologist

Toussaint-Bernard Émeric-David (20 August 1755 – 2 April 1839) was a French archaeologist and writer on art.

== Life ==
Éméric-David was born in Aix-en-Provence. He gained a law degree at the university at Aix-en-Provence in 1775. Destined for the legal profession, and having gone in 1775 to Paris to complete his legal education, he acquired there a taste for art which influenced his whole future career. He went to Italy, where he continued his art studies. He soon returned, however, to his native village, and followed for some time the profession of an advocate; but in 1787 he succeeded his uncle Antoine David as printer to the parlement.

He was elected mayor of Aix in 1791, but as the French Revolution worsened for public officials, he moved to Paris and then briefly into hiding during the Reign of Terror. For some time to adopt a vagrant life. When danger was past he returned to Aix, sold his printing business, and engaged in general commercial pursuits; but he was not long in renouncing these also in order to devote himself exclusively to literature and art. Paris became his new home and he resolved to be an art historian.

From 1809 to 1814, under the Empire, he represented his département in the Lower House (Corps législatif); in 1814 he voted for the downfall of Napoleon; in 1815 he retired into private life, and in 1816 he was elected a member of the Institute (Académie des Inscriptions et Belles-Lettres). He died in Paris on 2 April 1839.

== Works ==
Éméric-David was placed in 1825 on the commission appointed to continue L'Histoire littraire de la France. His principal works are Recherches sur l'art statuaire, considéré chez les anciens et les modernes (Paris, 1805), a work which obtained the prize of the institute; Choix de pièces: notices sur divers tableaux du Musée Napoléon (Paris, 1812); Suite d'études calquées et dessinées d'après cinq tableaux de Raphaël (Paris, 1818–1821), in 6 vols.; Jupiter: Recherches sur ce dieu, sur son culte, et sur les monuments qui le représentent (Paris, 1833), 2 vols., illustrated; and Vulcain (Paris, 1837).

== Legacy ==
A street in the centre of Aix-en-Provence named in his honor.

== Sources ==
- Biographical article at the site of Duke University's Lilly Library
