= Maryse Joissains =

French politician (born 1942)

Maryse Joissains-Masini
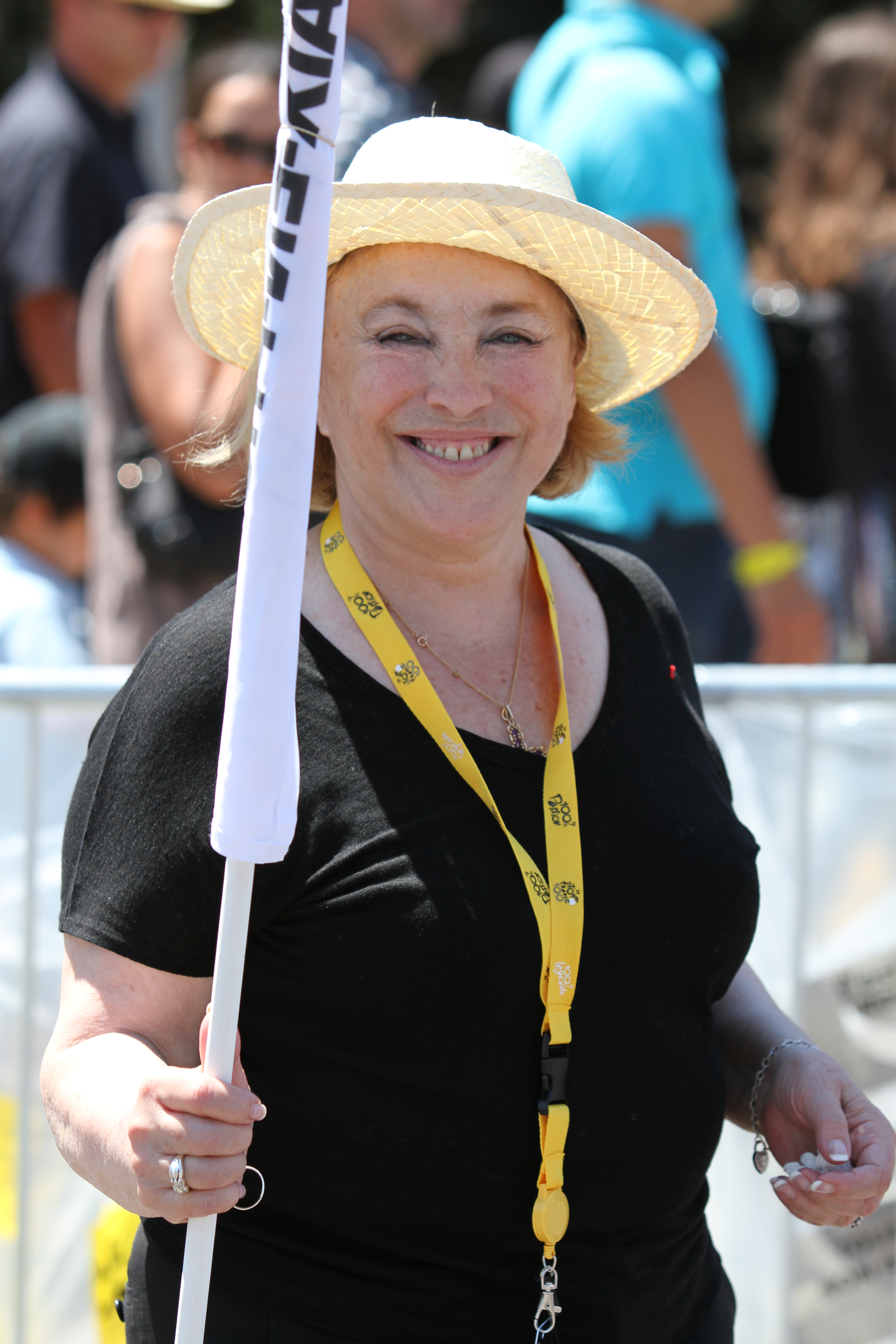
- Maryse Joissains-Masini at the 2013 Tour de France

Mayor of Aix-en-Provence
- In office 25 March 2001 – 24 September 2021
- Preceded by: Jean-François Picheral
- Succeeded by: Sophie Joissains

Member of the National Assembly for Bouche-du-Rhône's 14th Constituency
- In office 19 June 2002 – 20 June 2012
- Preceded by: Jean-Bernard Raimond
- Succeeded by: Jean-David Ciot

Personal details
- Born: Maryse Charton; 15 August 1942 (age 84) Toulon, France
- Party: The Republicans
- Spouse: Alain Joissains (divorced)
- Children: Sophie Joissains
- Education: University of the South, Toulon-Var; Aix-Marseille University
- Occupation: Lawyer; Politician

Maryse Joissains-Masini (French pronunciation: [maʁiz ʒwasɛ̃ mazini]; born 15 August 1942), also known as Maryse Charton, was the mayor of Aix-en-Provence from 2001 to 2021. She was also a member of the National Assembly of France. in which she represented the Bouches-du-Rhône department, and is a member of The Republicans party.

== Biography ==
=== Early life ===
Maryse Charton was born 15 August 1942 in Toulon, France. Her parents were both Communists, and her father was Maurice Thorez's bodyguard. She worked for the Social Security in France and volunteered as a young communist. She then received a BA degree from the University of the South, Toulon-Var followed by a master's degree and a PhD from Aix-Marseille University.

=== Career ===
She subsequently taught criminology and private law at Aix-Marseille University. In 1968, she married Alain Joissains. In 1970, she started her career as a lawyer. She worked in the cases of the Infected blood scandal and the use of asbestos. It was also then that she became a follower of Jean-Jacques Servan-Schreiber and joined the Radical Party.

From 1983 to 1989, she was a member of the regional council of Provence-Alpes-Côte d'Azur. She has been the Mayor of Aix-en-Provence since 2001. She signed a law criminalizing drunkenness in public, a move aimed at the area's homeless people. In 2009, her re-election was invalidated by a former councilor, Stéphane Salord, under the assumption that allegations spread about her opponent François-Xavier de Peretti were too personal and violent. Nevertheless, she was re–elected. In June 2011, she voted against same-sex marriage. She has been accused of not attending the sessions in the National Assembly of France. However, she responded by saying she was in attendance once a month. She is among the French politicians who hold the most elected positions at different levels of government. She is a recipient of the Legion of Honour.

Shortly after François Hollande was elected president in 2012, she suggested that he might be "illegitimate", arguing that the entire French media and labor unions supported him and unfairly criticized Nicolas Sarkozy's tenure, and she asked the Constitutional Council of France to annul the election results; however, she was rebuffed.

=== Personal life ===
Her former husband, Alain Joissains, was the mayor of Aix-en-Provence from 1978 to 1983. Now divorced, their daughter Sophie Joissains was a member of the French Senate and mayor of Aix-en-Provence since 2021.

Political offices
Preceded by Jean-François Picheral	Mayor of Aix-en-Provence; 2001–2021	Succeeded by Sophie Joissains
