= Museum d'Histoire Naturelle Aix-en-Provence =

Natural history museum in Aix en Provence, France

Coordinates: 43°31′41″N 5°26′56″E

The Museum d’Histoire Naturelle Aix en Provence is a natural history museum in Aix en Provence, France.

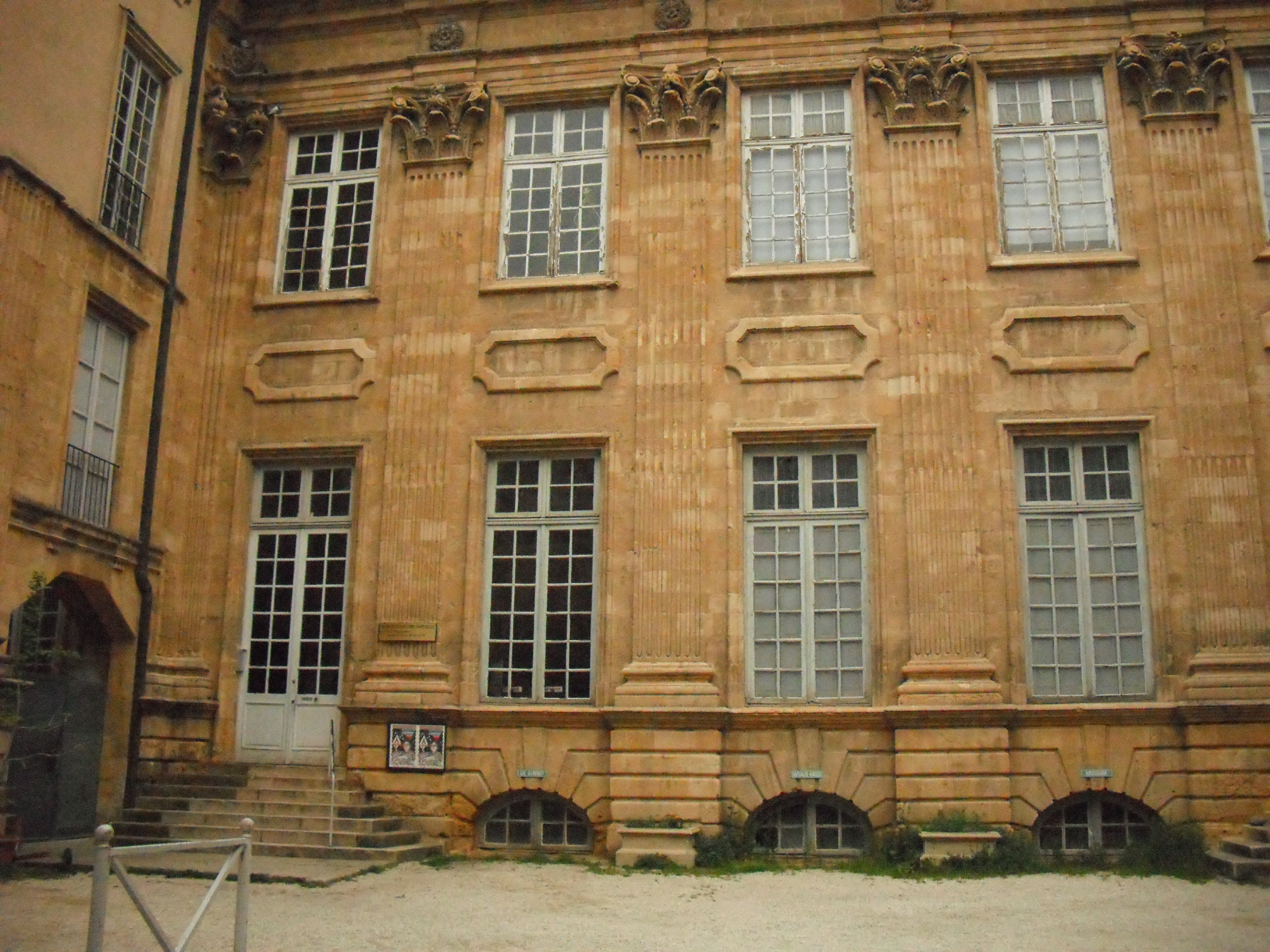
Hôtel Boyer d'Eguilles, the old building of the museum.

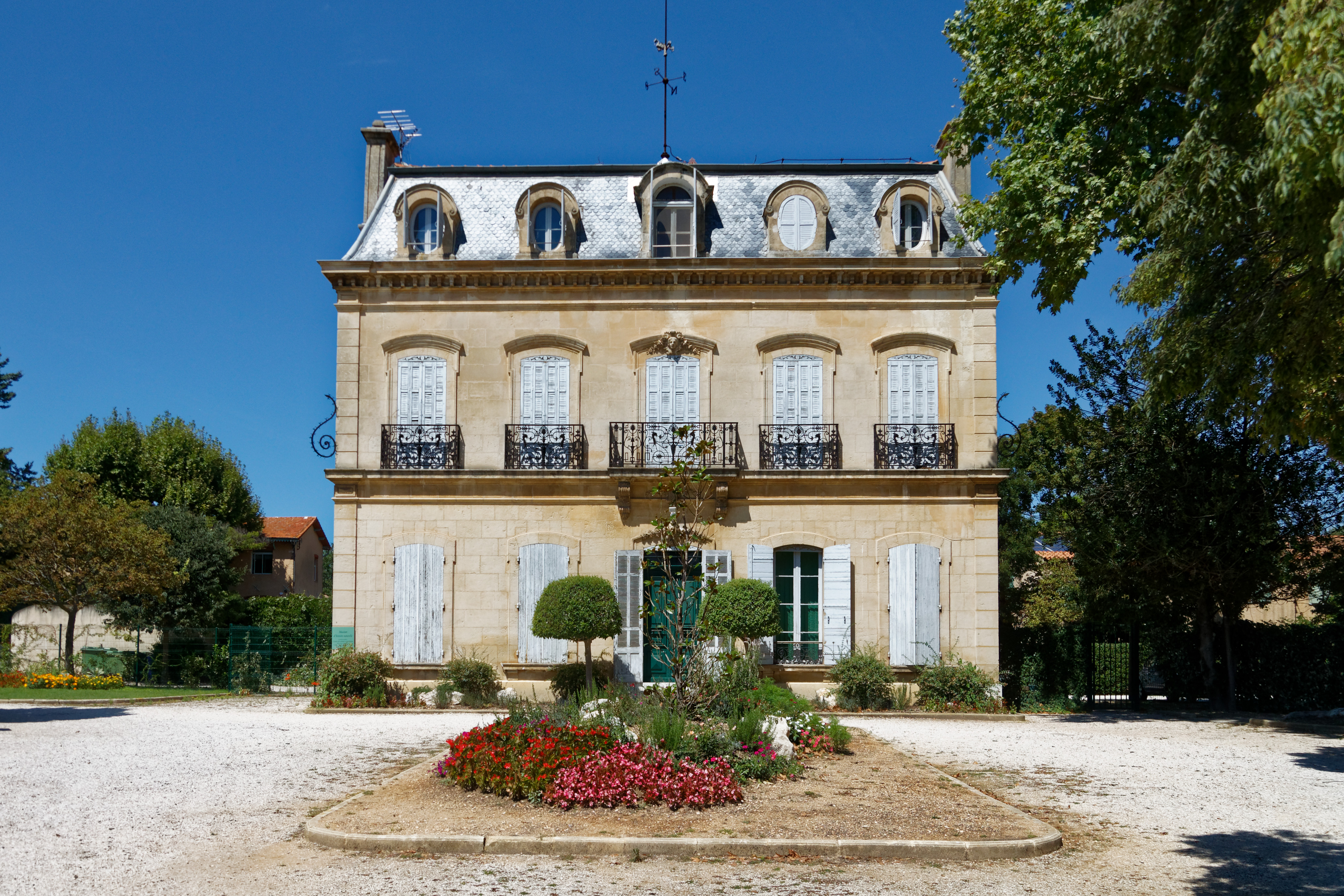
Building in the Saint-Mitre Park, planned new seat of the museum

== Building ==
Up to 2014, the museum was accommodated in the Hôtel Boyer d'Eguilles in the city of Aix. For the time being, the collections have been brought to different sites and are not accessible to the public with the exception of pedagogic activities. It is planned to re-open the museum in 2019–2020 in a house in the Saint-Mitre Park.

== Collection ==
The museum contains the collections of:

- Louis Charles Joseph Gaston de Saporta(1823–1895)
- Casimir de Barrigue, Comte de Montvallon (1774–1845).
- Jules Sébastien César Dumont d'Urville (1790–1842)
- Henri Coquand (1813–1881)
- Eugénie Louise Valentine Rostan-d'Abancourt(1848–1903)
- Philippe Félix Sextius Aude (1836–1912)
- Raymond Paul Dughi (1898–1977)
- Ernest Gustave Gobert (1879–1973)
