= Alain Joissains =

French politician

Mayor of Aix-en-Provence
- In office 29 June 1978 – 18 March 1983
- Preceded by: Félix Ciccolini
- Succeeded by: Jean-Pierre de Peretti Della Rocca

Personal details
- Born: Alain Joissains; 30 August 1942 (age 83)
- Party: UDI; Radical Party
- Spouse: Maryse Joissains-Masini (divorced)
- Children: Sophie Joissains
- Occupation: Politician

Alain Joissains (born 30 August 1942) is a French politician. He served as the Mayor of Aix-en-Provence from 1978 to 1983.

== Biography ==
=== Early life ===
His father was a policeman. He started working as a cabin boy at the age of fifteen and as a stevedore in Toulon by the age of seventeen. He studied law at Aix-Marseille University and received a doctorate. He started working as a lawyer in Aix.

=== Political career ===
He became interested in politics upon his disappointment in General Charles de Gaulle (1890-1970)'s abandonment of the harkis during the Algerian War of 1954-1962. Instead, he supported Jean-Jacques Servan-Schreiber (1924-2006) and joined the Radical Party, a centre-right political party.

He served as the Mayor of Aix-en-Provence from 1978 to 1983. During his tenure, he lowered the local tax by 2%, increased the number of pocket parks and car-parks, and encouraged low-income inhabitants to purchase the council flats they lived in. By January 1983, as he was set to be re-elected as mayor with a 66% majority, but was then accused by the tabloid newspaper Le Canard enchaîné of embezzlement in order to pay for the construction of his father-in-law's house in Saint-Antonin-sur-Bayon. He retorted that Gaston Defferre (1910-1986), who then served as Mayor of adjacent Marseille and as Minister of Interior Affairs, had schemed this plot to squander his chances of reelection. However, he did receive a two-year suspended prison sentence for embezzlement. Subsequently, his father-in-law committed suicide and he got divorced. However, he still maintained he was innocent.

In 1995, he published a memoir he co-wrote with his wife about his experience, entitled Sang et or: combat pour Aix-en-Provence (English: Blood and gold: the fight for Aix-en-Provence).

From 2001 to 2008, he served as an assistant to the Mayor of Aix, then his former wife. He stepped down after he was accused of being paid too much for his position due to possible cronyism. However, his wife suggested he was paid as much as former assistants to the Mayors of Aix. Even though he no longer gets paid, he still attends the meetings of the city council, when he sits behind his wife.

=== Personal life ===
He was married to Maryse Joissains-Masini, who has served as the mayor of Aix-en-Provence since 2001. They have a daughter, Sophie Joissains, who serves as a French senator.

== See also ==
- List of mayors of Aix-en-Provence

== Bibliography ==
- Alain Joissains, Maryse Joissains, Sang et or: combat pour Aix-en-Provence (Édition les Vents contraires, 1995, 164 pages).

Political offices
Preceded by Félix Ciccolini	Mayor of Aix-en-Provence; 1978-1983	Succeeded by Jean-Pierre de Peretti Della Rocca
