= Église du Saint-Esprit (Aix-en-Provence) =

Coordinates: 43.5275°N 5.4468°E

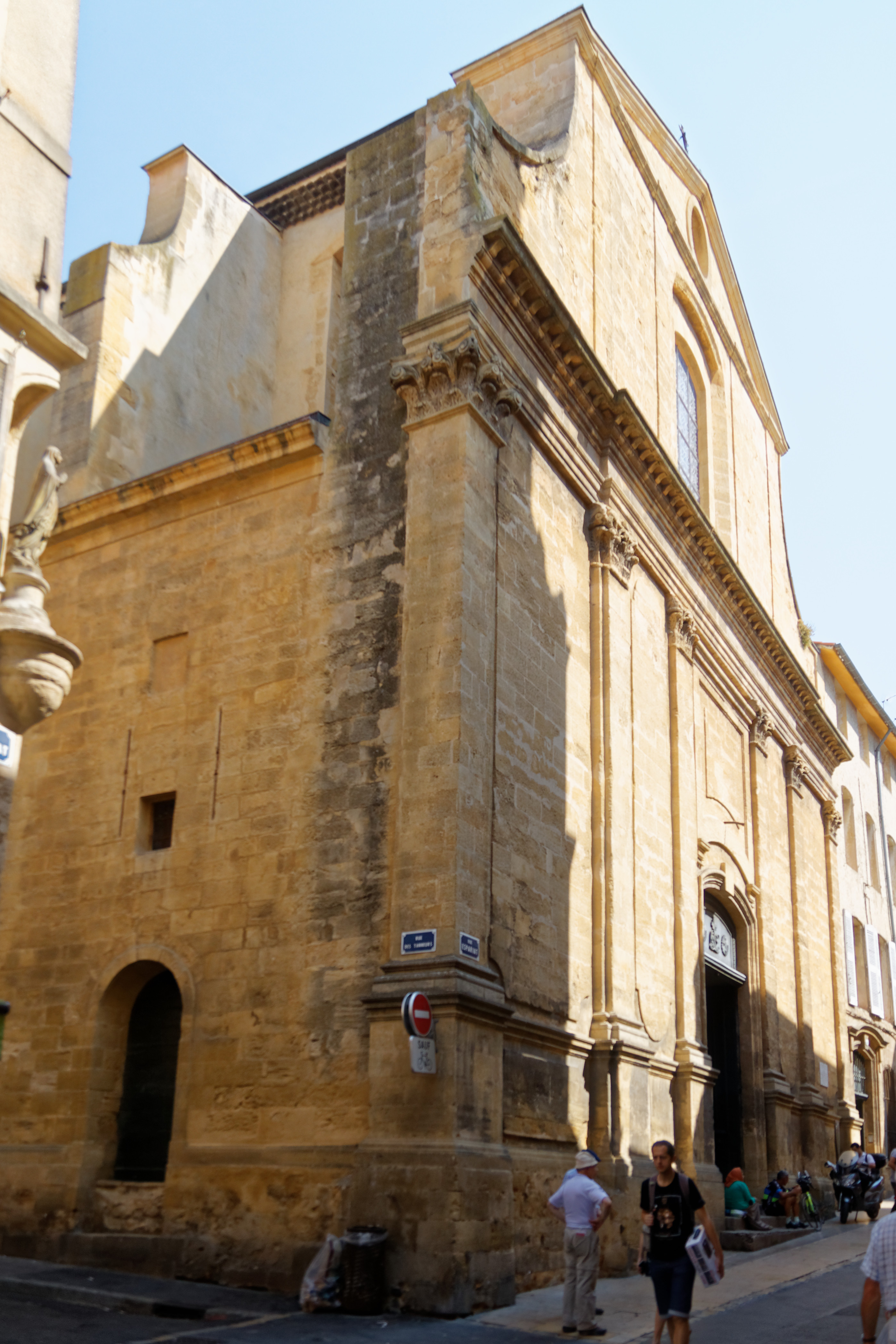
- Église du Saint-Esprit
- Église du Saint-Esprit
- Location: Aix-en-Provence; Bouches-du-Rhône, Provence-Alpes-Côte d'Azur
- Country: France
- Denomination: Roman Catholic Church
- Tradition: Order of the Holy Ghost

History
- Status: Cathedral
- Founded: 18th century
- Dedicated: 1716

Architecture
- Heritage designation: Monument historique
- Designated: December 31, 1985
- Architect(s): Laurent Vallon; Georges Vallon
- Architectural type: church

Administration
- Archdeaconry: Roman Catholic Archdiocese of Aix

Clergy
- Archbishop: Christian Delarbre
- Priest(s): Louis-Marie Ecomard; Bastien Romera

The Église du Saint-Esprit is a Roman Catholic church in Aix-en-Provence.

== Location ==
It is located at 40 rue Espariat in Aix-en-Provence.

== History ==
In the 18th century, the Hôpital du Saint-Esprit, a hospital of the Order of the Holy Ghost, and several houses were torn down to make way for the construction of a new church. It was designed by architects Laurent Vallon (1652-1724) and Georges Vallon (1688-1767), and built from 1706 to 1728. It was then known as Église Saint-Jérôme, in honour of Jérôme de Grimaldi (1597–1685), who served as Archbishop of Aix from 1655 to 1683. It was dedicated by Forbin-La Barben in 1716. It was fully sculpted and painted from 1726 to 1728.

Inside, there is a retable dating back to 1505.

== At present ==
It is the main parish church for university students in Aix. The current priests are Fr Gilles-Marie Lecomte and Fr Benoît Coppeaux

It is open every day from 7:30am to 11pm. The Chaplet of Divine Mercy is said every day from 5:30pm to 6pm, Confession and Adoration are from 6pm to 7pm. Additionally, the Eucharist is every day (except Saturdays), at 7pm. There is also a Mass on Saturdays at 6pm and on Sundays.

== Heritage significance ==
It has been listed as a monument historique since December 31, 1985.

== Gallery ==
Église du Saint-Esprit
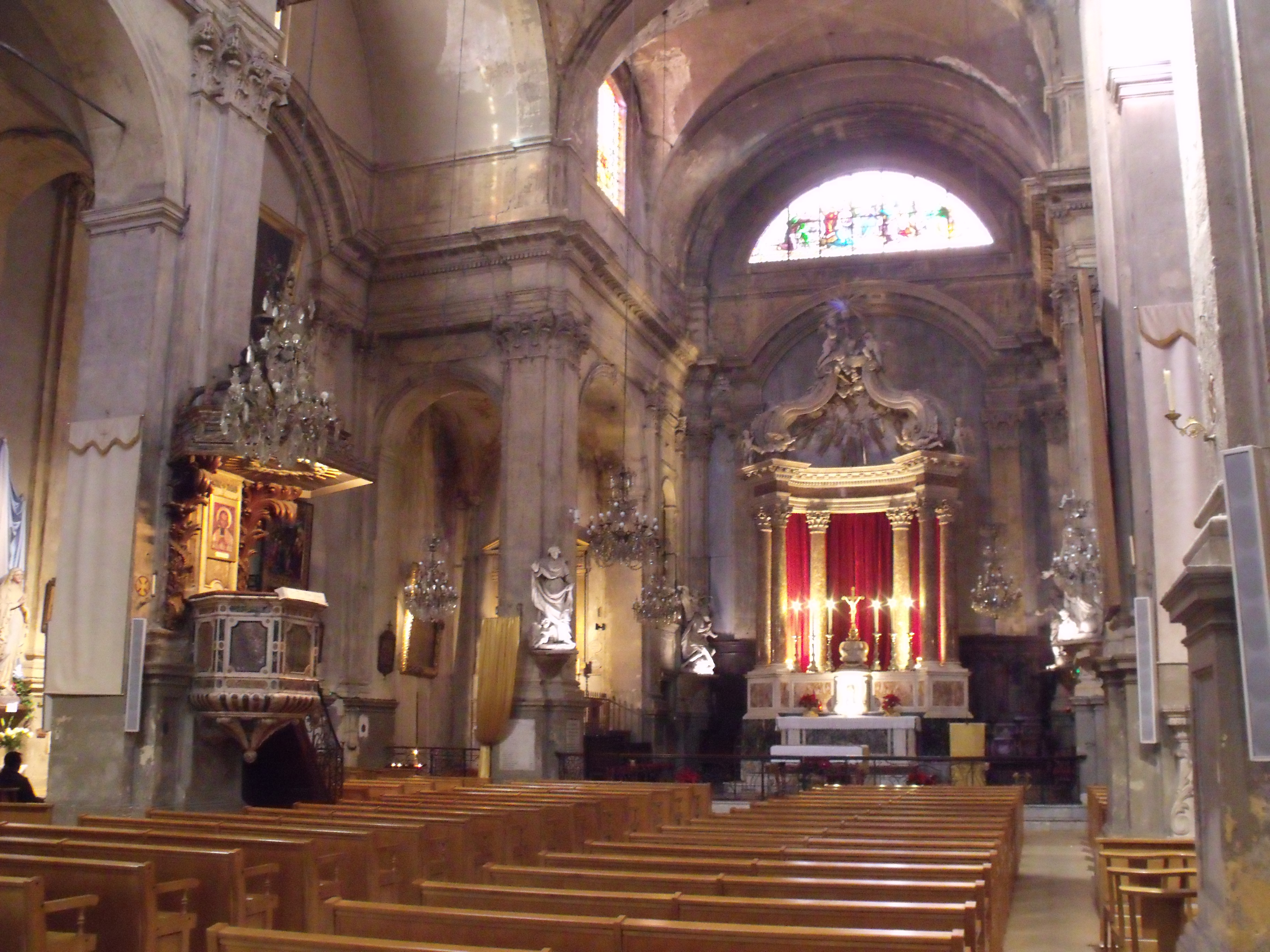
Nave

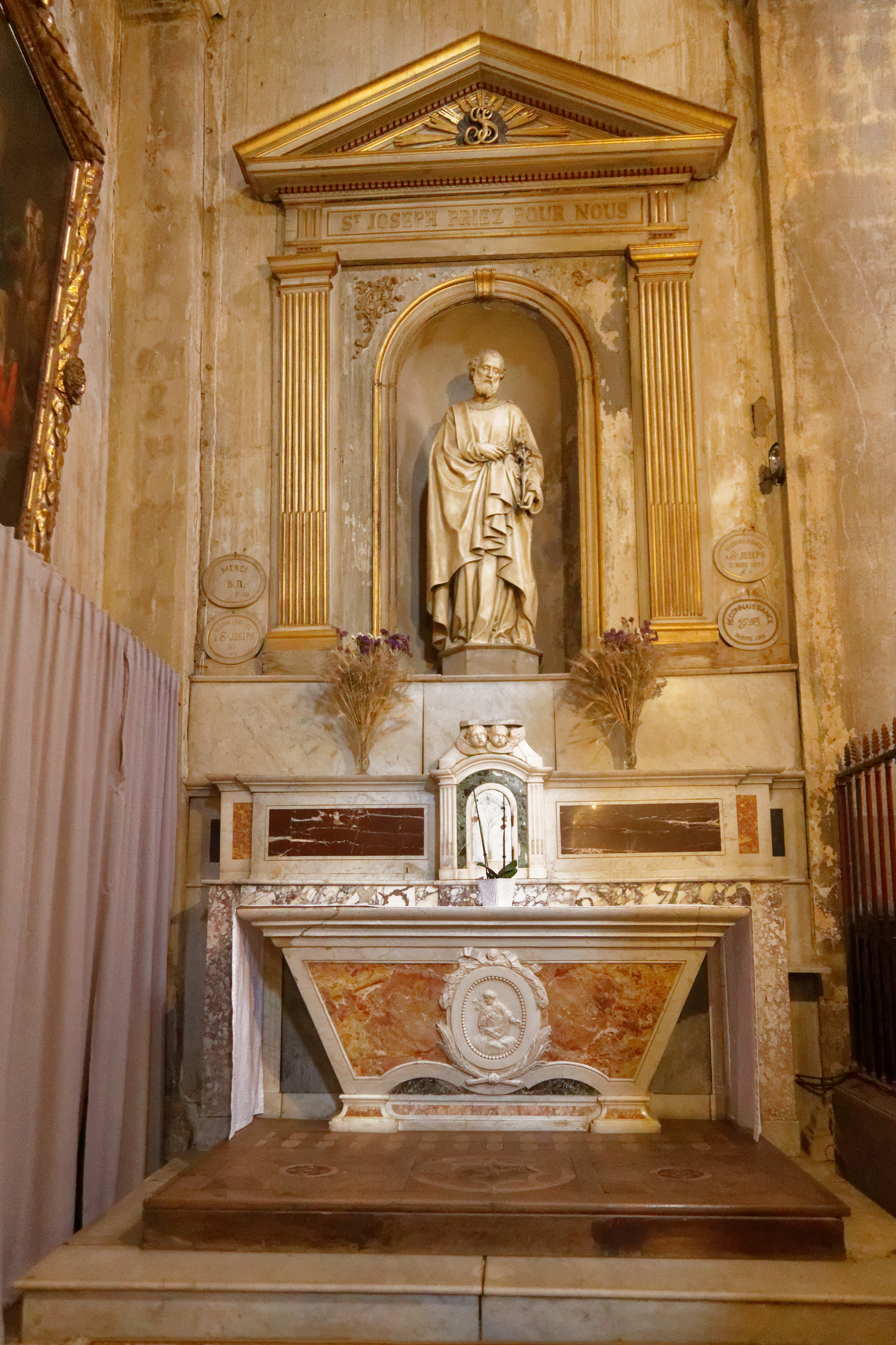
Left side altar

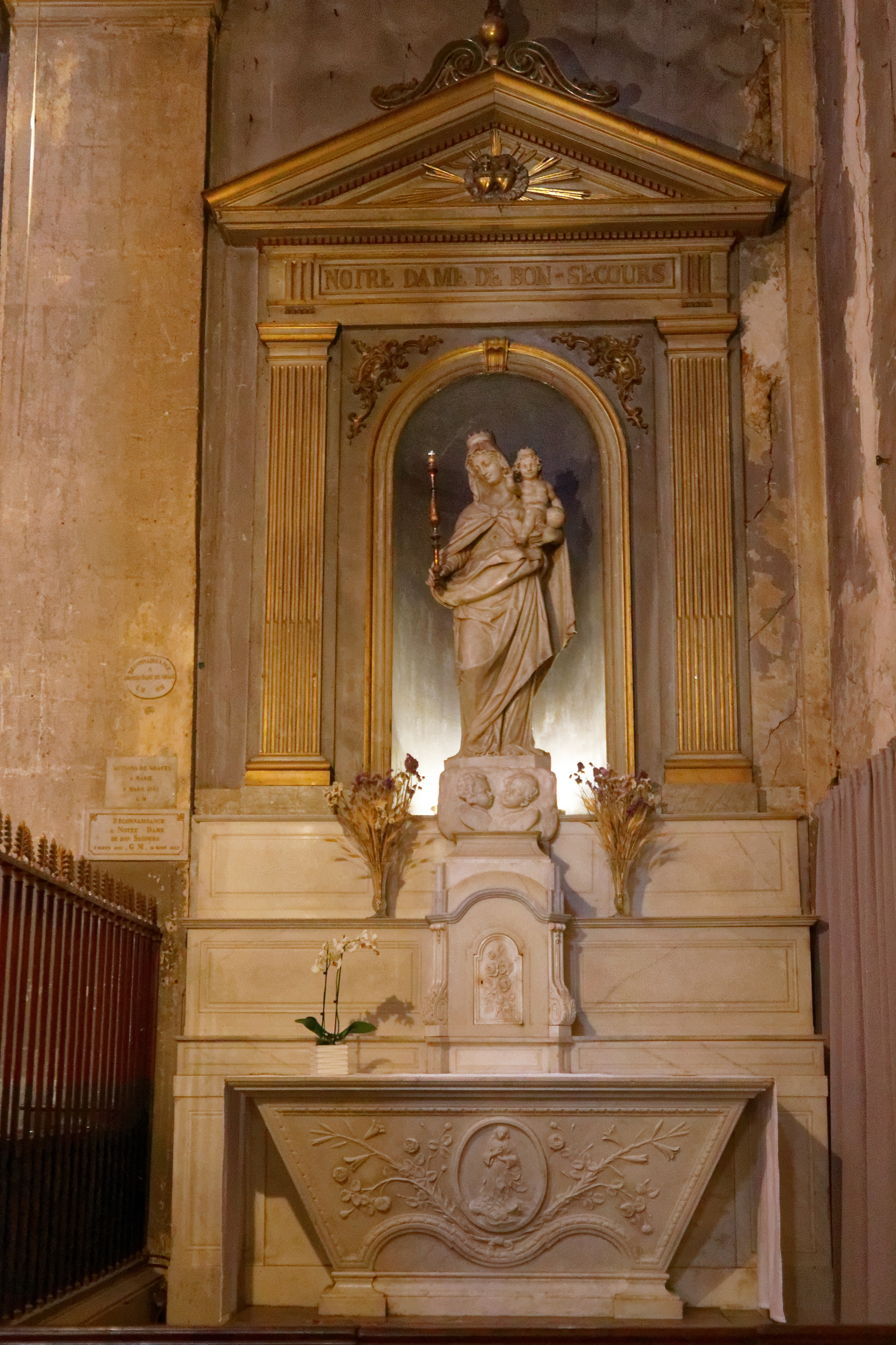
Right side altar

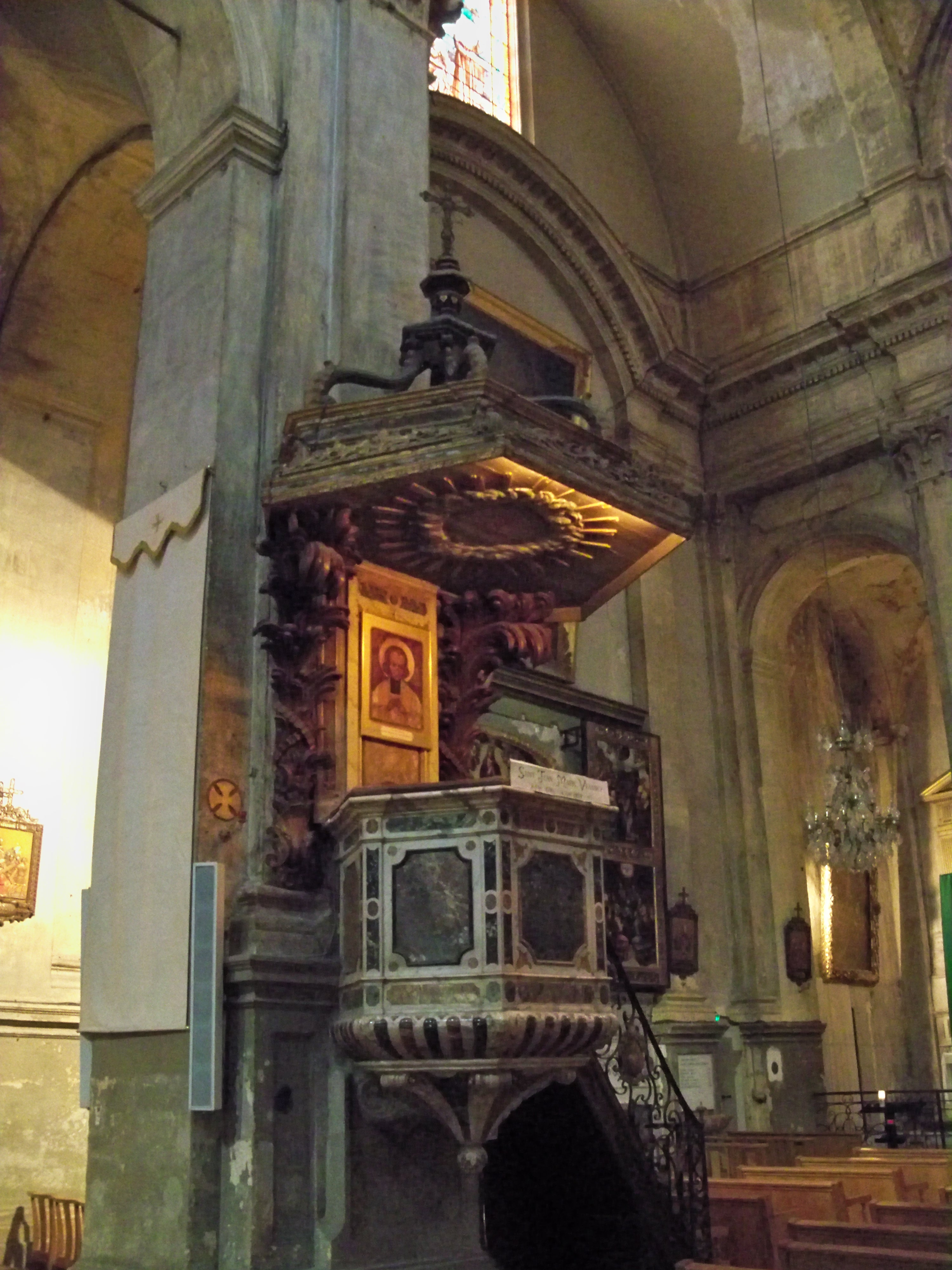
Pulpit

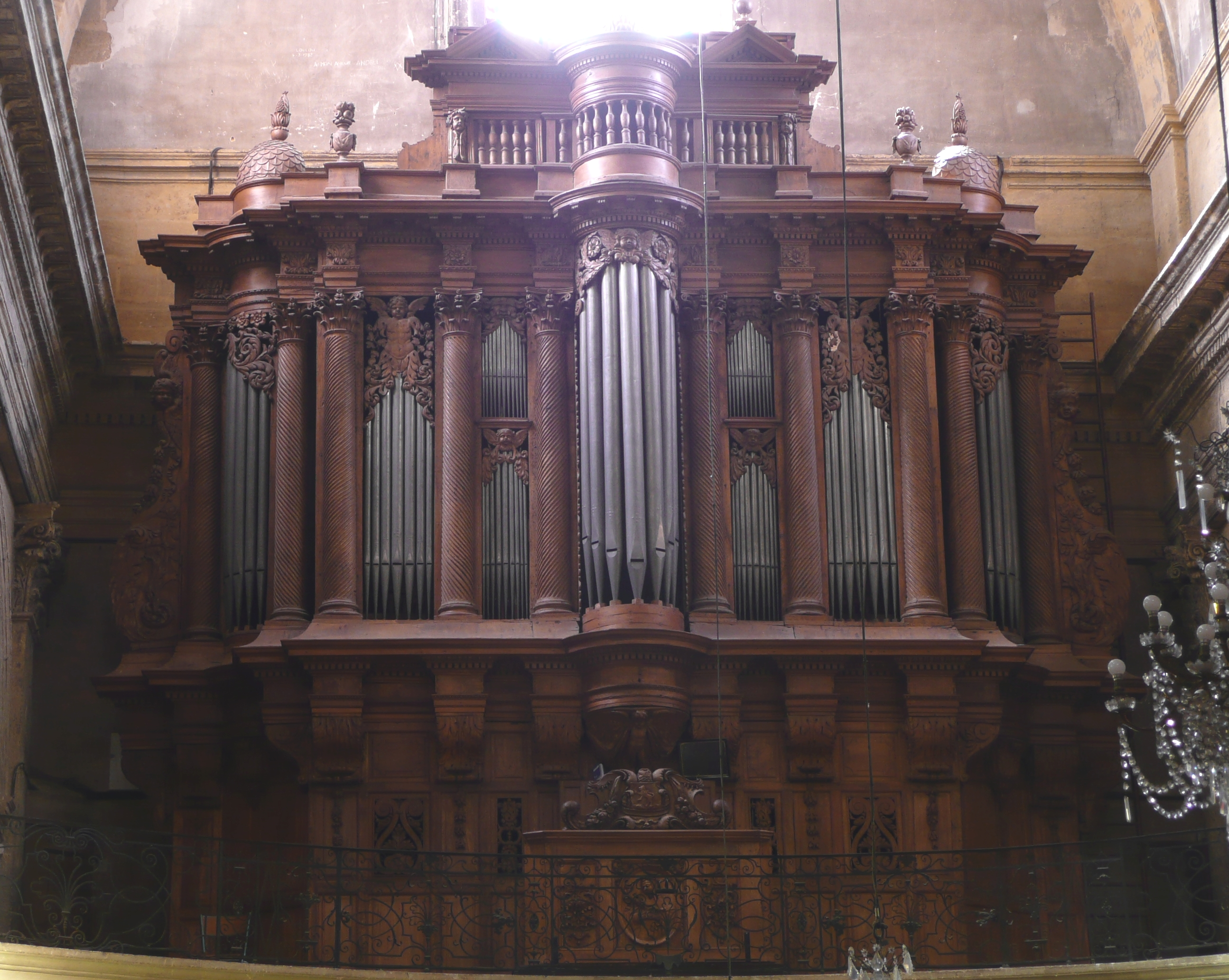
Pipe organs
