= Michael V. Hayden Center =

Michael V. Hayden Center for Intelligence, Policy, and International Security
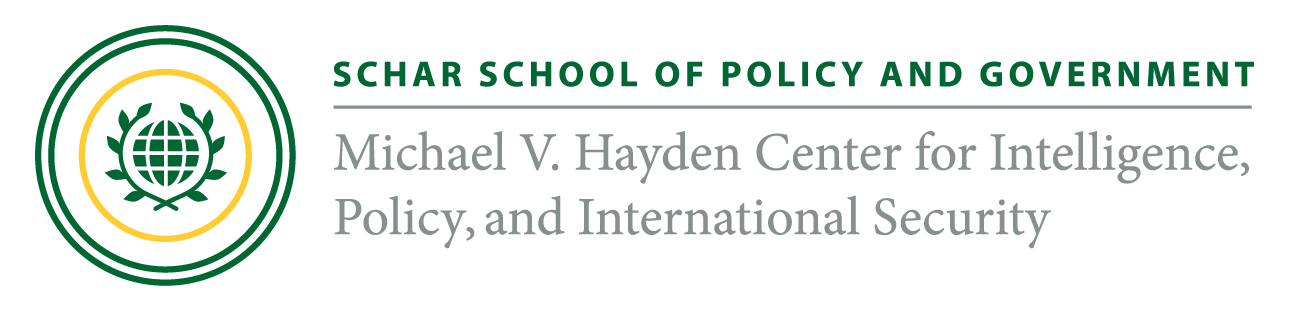

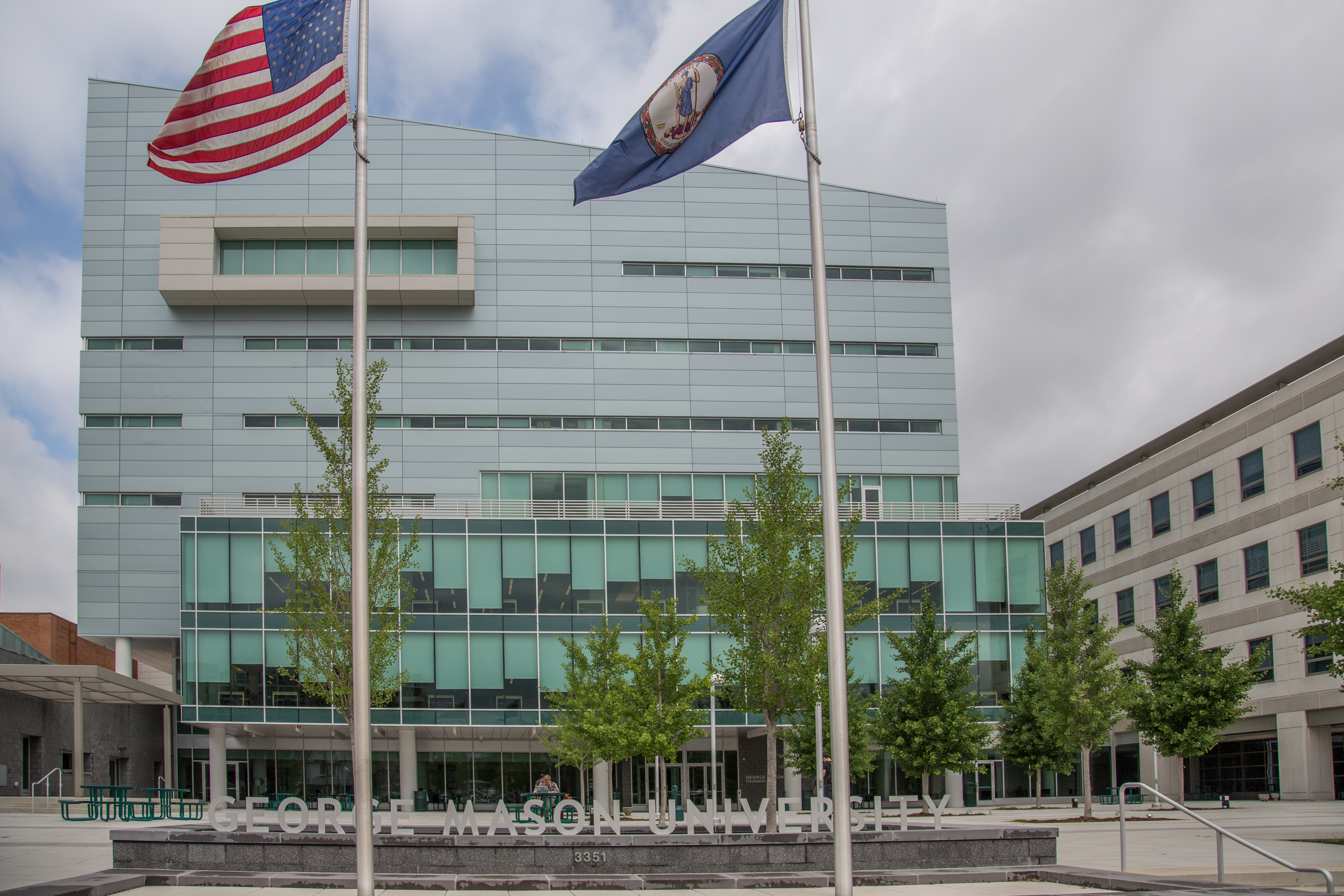
- Hayden Center offices in Arlington County, Virginia
- Formation: 2017; 8 years ago
- Founder: Michael V. Hayden
- Type: Foreign Policy, National Security, Intelligence Studies, International Security, Intelligence Analysis, and International Relations Public Policy think tank
- Headquarters: 3351 Fairfax Drive
- Location: Arlington County, Virginia, U.S.
- Coordinates: 38.884622°N 77.100731°W
- Director: Larry Pfeiffer
- Parent organization: George Mason University - Schar School of Policy and Government
- Affiliations: (2017–present)
- Website: haydencenter.gmu.edu

The Michael V. Hayden Center for Intelligence, Policy, and International Security (Hayden Center) is a think tank in Arlington County, Virginia focused on the intelligence community including topics related to intelligence studies education, intelligence analysis techniques, the operations of intelligence agencies, and public policy and international relations related to national security, international security, and foreign policy through shared experiences of senior intelligence service leaders, military officers, elected officials, journalists, academics, and other civilian scholars.

The center is housed in the Schar School of Policy and Government but also cooperates with the Antonin Scalia Law School’s National Security Institute (another think tank) in conducting research around legal issues pertaining to national security; both of which are affiliated with George Mason University.

== History ==
The Hayden Center was created in October 2017 by Michael V. Hayden, former director of the Central Intelligence Agency and National Security Agency, retired Four-star general and highest ranking intelligence officer in the U.S. Air Force, and former Principal Deputy Director of National Intelligence. Hayden came to George Mason in 2009 with his long time General counsel Robert Deitz, and the two have served as professors at the Schar School of Policy and Government since then. The Hayden Center was created at the Schar School in 2017.

== Programs and events ==
=== Events ===
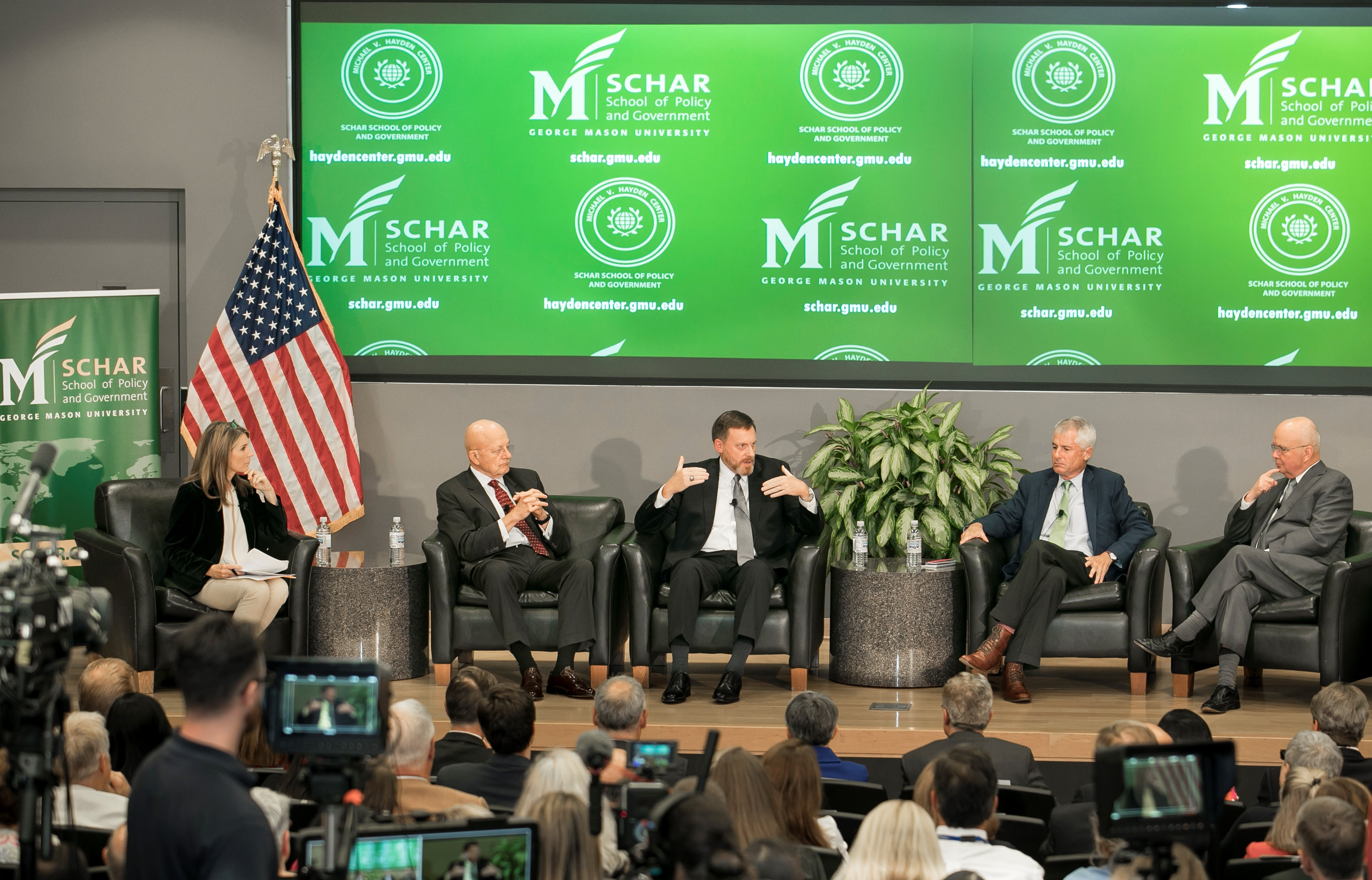
MSNBC's Nicolle Wallace moderating a panel discussion with James Clapper, Mike Rogers, Philip Mudd, and Michael Hayden at the Hayden Center in September 2018

The center retains a number of scholars for publications, debates, and public forums including intelligence and foreign policy professionals, journalists, and politicians. The events are frequently broadcast nationally on the C-SPAN Network, and soundbytes and quotes from discussions have appeared frequently in national media outlets. Previous speakers and hosts have included a range of federal agency leaders, including former Directors of Central Intelligence Gates, Woolsey, Deutch, Tenet, McLaughlin, and Goss, Director of National Intelligence James Clapper as well as former Directors of the Central Intelligence Agency Hayden, Morell, Petraeus, and Brennan.

From the National Security Agency, former Director Michael Rogers and former General Counsel Glenn Gerstell have joined the center on occasion. From the National Geospatial-Intelligence Agency, former Director Robert Cardillo, from the FBI, former acting Director Andrew McCabe, as well as former Principal Deputy Director of National Intelligence Susan M. Gordon, former Assistant Attorney General for DOJ OLC Jack Goldsmith, and former Assistant Secretary of the Treasury for Intelligence and Analysis Leslie Ireland.

During seminars on legislative oversight and the role of Congress in intelligence, a variety of current and former members of the Congressional intelligence committees have appeared, including sitting Vice Chairman of the Senate Select Committee on Intelligence (SSCI) Senator Mark Warner, former members Saxby Chambliss and Bill Nelson and former House Permanent Select Committee on Intelligence (HPSCI) members Jane Harman and Mike Rogers.

Several senior military officers have also appeared at the Center, including NATO Supreme Allied Commander Wesley Clark and Commander of U.S. Special Operations Command Admiral Bill McRaven.

Senior members of the foreign affairs press have also attended the center, sometimes interviewing other guests. Journalists who have joined the Center in the past have included NBC News Chief Foreign Affairs Correspondent Andrea Mitchell, CBS News Senior Foreign Affairs Correspondent Margaret Brennan, MSNBC Senior Political Analyst Nicolle Wallace, CBS News National Security Correspondent Olivia Gazis, Washington Post Intelligence Columnist David Ignatius, and Washington Post National Security Editor Peter Finn. Several events have also been hosted by The National Press Club.

==== Other work ====
The center has cohosted events with Lawfare on the subject of the President's Daily Briefing. Its also hosted live tapings of CBS News' Intelligence Matters Podcast which is hosted by senior fellow Michael Morell.

==== The Cipher Brief ====
The Hayden Center is part of an academic incubator program with The Cipher Brief, an intelligence and national security tradepaper founded by former CNN Intelligence Correspondent Suzanne Kelly, where the Center's students are occasionally published in the publication's periodicals.

==== Michael Hayden stroke ====
In 2018, founder Michael Hayden was hospitalized for a stroke shortly after a highly publicized online row with President Trump over criticism of the administration by former intelligence officials who retained Top Secret security clearances in retirement. The incident culminated in President Trump stripping former CIA Director John Brennan of his clearance, reportedly at the time considering doing the same to Hayden. The Hayden Center put out a statement on behalf of the Hayden family which was carried in the context of the clearance fight by many national outlets.

== Leadership and scholars ==
=== Director ===
The Director of the Center is Larry Pfeiffer, who served as director of the White House Situation Room during the Obama Administration and previously as Chief of Staff of the Central Intelligence Agency under Director Michael Hayden.

=== Fellows ===
- Michael Morell, Senior Fellow and former Acting Director of the Central Intelligence Agency.
- David Priess, Senior Fellow and former presidential daily briefer at the CIA.

=== Faculty committee ===
- Guadalupe Correa-Cabrera, professor of comparative politics and US–Mexico policy
- Robert Deitz, former general counsel to the director of the CIA, NSA, and NGA
- Colin Dueck, foreign policy fellow, American Enterprise Institute
- Michael Hunzeker, assistant director, George Mason University Center for Security Policy Studies
- Gregory Koblentz, Weapons of Mass Destruction expert
- Ellen Laipson, former CEO, Stimson Center
- Stuart S. Malawer, professor of law and national security
- Jeremy Mayer, former State Department instructor and professor of government
- James Pfiffner, professor emeritus, American government
- D Matthew Scherer, professor, political theory and Constitutional law
- Bonnie Stabile, professor of public policy, gender, and health policy
- Ming Wan, associate dean, Schar School of Policy and Government, and professor of East Asian political economy

=== Board of Advisors ===
The Center also has an undisclosed Board of Advisors composed of non-academic "intelligence, national security, legal, corporate, and international security" communities who guide strategy.
