= Transatlantic Policy Consortium =

International organization centered on public policy

The Transatlantic Policy Consortium (TPC) is a network of 42 North America and European higher education institutions that conduct education, training, and research in the field of public policy and public administration. Its ostensible mission is to promote an ongoing dialogue of students and faculty and to conduct joint research on contemporary transatlantic public policy issues. Papers written for the consortium's colloquia are published in the Transatlantic Public Policy Series with LIT Publishers in Germany. Current co-chairmen are professors Charles F. Bonser of Indiana University School of Public and Environmental Affairs and Eberhard Bohne of the German University of Administrative Sciences Speyer.

== History ==
The consortium developed out of colloquia on transatlantic public policy issues jointly sponsored by Indiana University O'Neill School of Public and Environmental Affairs and École Nationale d'Administration - Institut national du service public since 1997. It was formally established in May 2000, and has been a grant recipient of the Bosch Foundation since 2008.

== Members ==
=== North America ===
United States
California

- University of Southern California
  - USC Price School of Public Policy

Georgia

- University of Georgia
  - University of Georgia School of Public and International Affairs

Indiana

- Indiana University Bloomington and Indiana University–Purdue University Indianapolis
  - Indiana University Maurer School of Law
  - O'Neill School of Public and Environmental Affairs

Maryland

- University of Maryland, College Park
  - University of Maryland School of Public Policy

Massachusetts

- Suffolk University
  - Suffolk University Law School

New Jersey

- Rutgers University
  - Rutgers School of Public Affairs and Administration

New York

- New York University
  - Wagner Graduate School of Public Service
- Syracuse University
  - Maxwell School of Citizenship and Public Affairs
- University at Albany, SUNY
  - Rockefeller College of Public Affairs & Policy

Pennsylvania

- University of Pittsburgh
  - University of Pittsburgh Graduate School of Public and International Affairs

Texas

- University of Texas at Austin
  - Lyndon B. Johnson School of Public Affairs

Vermont

- Middlebury College
- Middlebury Institute of International Studies at Monterey

Virginia

- George Mason University
  - Schar School of Policy and Government

Washington, D.C.

- American University
  - American University School of Public Affairs

=== Europe ===
Belgium

- KU Leuven - Katholieke Universiteit Leuven

Denmark

- Danish School of Public Administration

France

- Paris Sciences et Lettres University (PSL University)
  - Institut national du service public (as successor to the École Nationale d'Administration)
- Sorbonne University (as successor to Paris-Sorbonne University)
- University of Reims Champagne-Ardenne

Germany

- Federal Academy of Public Administration (Associate Member)
- German University of Administrative Sciences Speyer
  - German Research Institute for Public Administration
- Hertie School of Governance
- Institute for Technology Assessment and Systems Analysis (ITAS), KIT
- Max Planck Institute of Geoanthropology
  - Max Planck Institute of Economics
- University of Potsdam
- University of Bremen
- University of Erfurt
  - Willy Brandt School of Public Policy
- Zeppelin University

Netherlands

- Delft University of Technology
- Erasmus University Rotterdam
- Leiden University
- Tilburg University
- Utrecht University

Poland

- The Polish Institute of International Affairs

Portugal

- University of Lisbon
  - Instituto Superior Técnico

Spain

- King Juan Carlos University
- Pompeu Fabra University

Sweden

- Jönköping University

United Kingdom

- University of Birmingham
- University of Glasgow
