= Unrechtsstaat =

German term for a state not constrained by law

In German politics, the term Unrechtsstaat (German: [ˈʊnʁɛçt͡sˌʃtaːt]; pl. Unrechtsstaaten, German: [ˈʊnʁɛçt͡sˌʃtaːtn̩]), is a pejorative meaning 'unlawful state' or 'unconstitutional state' (literally, 'unjust state') used to refer to a state in which the exercise of major aspects of governmental power is not constrained by the law, as opposed to a Rechtsstaat (constitutional state). It is used not only as a jurisprudential term but also as a political one. The origin of the term is attributed to the Prussian Catholic politician Peter Reichensperger, who in 1853 used the term to imply that Prussia would become "unjust" if it curtailed the rights of its Catholic subjects.

== Examples ==
States that have been referred to as an Unrechtsstaat include authoritarian and autocratic regimes, such as:

=== Current ===
- Afghanistan
- Belarus
- China
- Iran
- Myanmar
- North Korea
- Russia and Russian-occupied territories
  - Crimea under Russian annexation
  - Donetsk People's Republic
  - Luhansk People's Republic
- Houthi Yemen

=== Historical ===
- East Germany
- Nazi Germany
- Ba'athist Iraq
- Fascist Italy
- Empire of Japan
- Apartheid-era South Africa
- Soviet Union
- Francoist Spain
- Ba'athist Syria

== Connotations ==
According to lawyer Horst Sendler, an Unrechtsstaat is characterized by a lack of striving for rights and an overall failure to achieve them. At the same time, individual violations of law and constitution do not make a state an Unrechtsstaat, because such violations also occur in a Rechtsstaat. Also, a state should not necessarily be considered an Unrechtsstaat even if it does not correspond with the model of a classical civil Rechtsstaat and in particular the German concept of a Rechtsstaat. On the other hand, the term Unrechtsstaat does not exclude the possibility of instances in which such a state has areas where qualities characteristic of a Rechtsstaat are dominant and where justice is realized in practice. In contrast to this notion of an Unrechtsstaat, Gerd Roellecke holds that the differentiating quality of an Unrechtsstaat is that it does not expect the equality of all people. In contrast with historical Nichtrechtsstaaten (non-Rechtsstaaten), Unrechtsstaaten have the capacity to be Rechtsstaaten after a period of historical development.

The German public is divided on whether to cite the German Democratic Republic (GDR) as an example of Unrechtsstaat. Scholars who view it as such maintain that it is an accurate designation because the state was not based on the rule of law and was unjust. Additionally, the traditional and commemorative practices and framings sanctioned by the German government depict the GDR as an Unrechtsstaat as well as a dictatorship. Others such as members of the left-wing Die Linke party criticize the label and claim that declaring the GDR an Unrechtsstaat is implying that any alternative to the "capitalist" system of Germany is illegitimate, that all laws in the GDR were unjust, and equating the GDR with Nazi Germany.

=== Verbrecherstaat ===
An Unrechtsstaat may be distinguished from a Verbrecherstaat or 'criminal state', where all the institutions of the state have been seized by a criminal enterprise; in such a case, while the state maintains the nomenclature and appearance of state action, governmental institutions become wholly perverted to serve criminal purposes. A common example of this is Nazi Germany during World War II and the Holocaust. A Verbrecherstaat is described as not a valid state at all, whereas an Unrechtsstaat is a valid state that nominally acknowledges the rule of law, but nevertheless systematically fails to maintain it. The German Federal Constitutional Court, in a series of judgements in the 1950s, established the principle that Nazi Germany should be considered to have been a Verbrecherstaat, since all German governmental institutions, organisations and public servants had been wholly perverted into a power apparatus in the service of the Nazi Party. However, some have criticized this argument as flawed, citing the fact that the Weimar Constitution technically remained in effect throughout the Nazi era from 1933 to 1945, and that Hitler used it to give his dictatorship the appearance of legality, holding three Reichstag elections during his rule, as proof. Regardless, there is no real practical difference between the way an Unrechtsstaat and a Verbrecherstaat treats its own citizens.
