= German University of Administrative Sciences Speyer =

Public management school in Speyer, Germany

Coordinates: 49°18′59″N 8°24′59″E

- Deutsche Universität für Verwaltungswissenschaften Speyer
- Type: Public
- Established: 1947
- Affiliations: EMPA; EGPA; SCEPSTA; NASPAA; TPC; IASIA
- President: Holger Mühlenkamp
- Faculty: 17 university professors, approx. 100 lecturers
- Postgraduates: Approx. 400
- Location: Speyer, Rhineland-Palatinate, Germany
- Campus: Suburban
- Colors: White and yellow
- Website: www.uni-speyer.de

The German University of Administrative Sciences Speyer (German: Deutsche Universität für Verwaltungswissenschaften Speyer; sometimes referred to as Speyer University), is a national graduate school for administrative sciences and public management located in Speyer, Rhineland-Palatinate, Germany. Founded in 1947 by the French occupational authorities as a grande école, today it is operated under the joint responsibility of both the Federal Republic (Bund) and all 16 German states (Länder). It runs four Master's programs, grants doctoral degrees and habilitations, offers a postgraduate certificate program, and administers programs of executive education. The school is a major training ground for German and international senior government officials. Noted alumni and faculty include former President of Germany Roman Herzog, Professor Niklas Luhmann; former Minister of Defence Christine Lambrecht, current Justice at the Federal Constitutional Court of Germany Heinrich Amadeus Wolff, former President of the Bundesbank Helmut Schlesinger, former Prosecutor General of Germany Alexander von Stahl, and CEO of BASF Jürgen Strube.

The school was founded in 1947, as the State Academy of Administrative Sciences Speyer (Staatliche Akademie für Verwaltungswissenschaften Speyer). In 1950 it was renamed the School of Administrative Sciences Speyer (Hochschule für Verwaltungswissenschaften Speyer) and after reunification became the German School of Administrative Sciences Speyer (Deutsche Hochschule für Verwaltungswissenschaften Speyer).

== History ==
The school was founded in 1947 as École Supérieure d'Administration by the French occupational authorities in order to democratize the German senior civil service. Created as a sister institution to École Nationale d'Administration, it was the first and only German school to employ the French grande école model. In 1950 it was formally established as a German institution of public law with legal capacity and entrusted with "fostering the administrative sciences in education and research". In 1961 and 1970 respectively, it was bestowed with the right to grant habilitations and doctorates, thereby receiving full university status. Since its inception, the school has had a reputation as an "elite training center". The school is the only German university run jointly by the Federal Republic (Bund) and all 16 German states (Länder).

== Academic programs ==
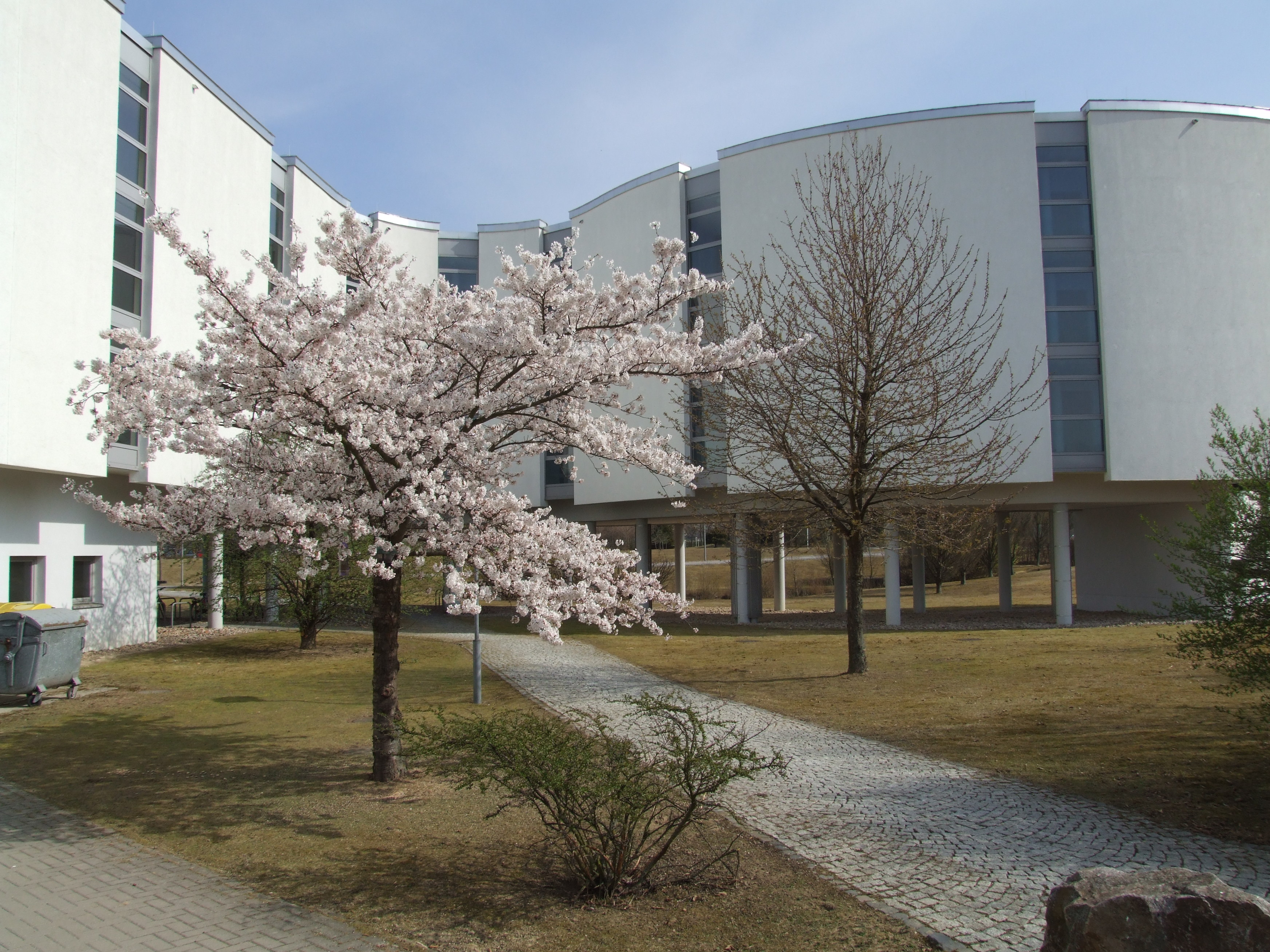
Otto Mayer House

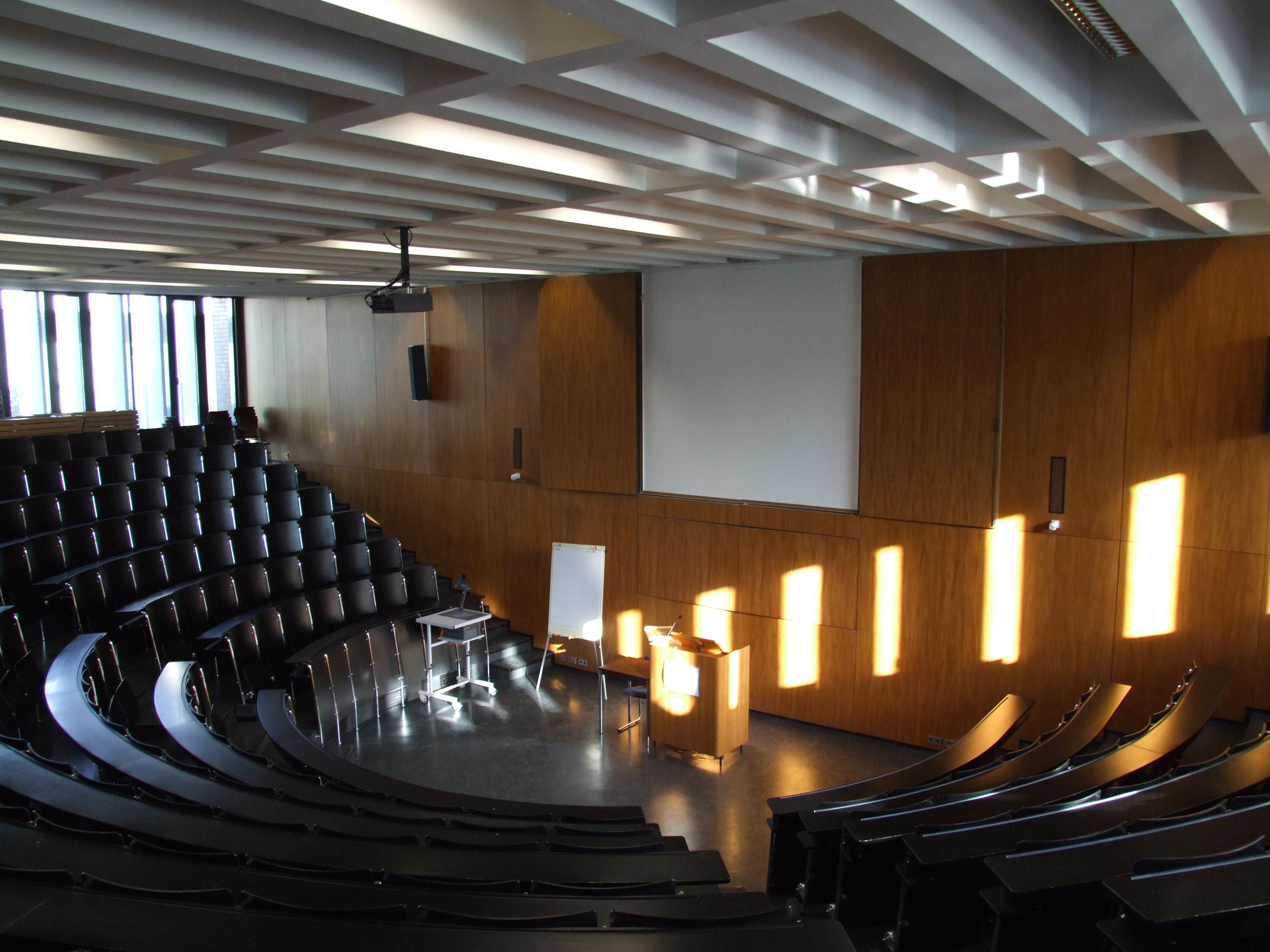
Main Auditorium

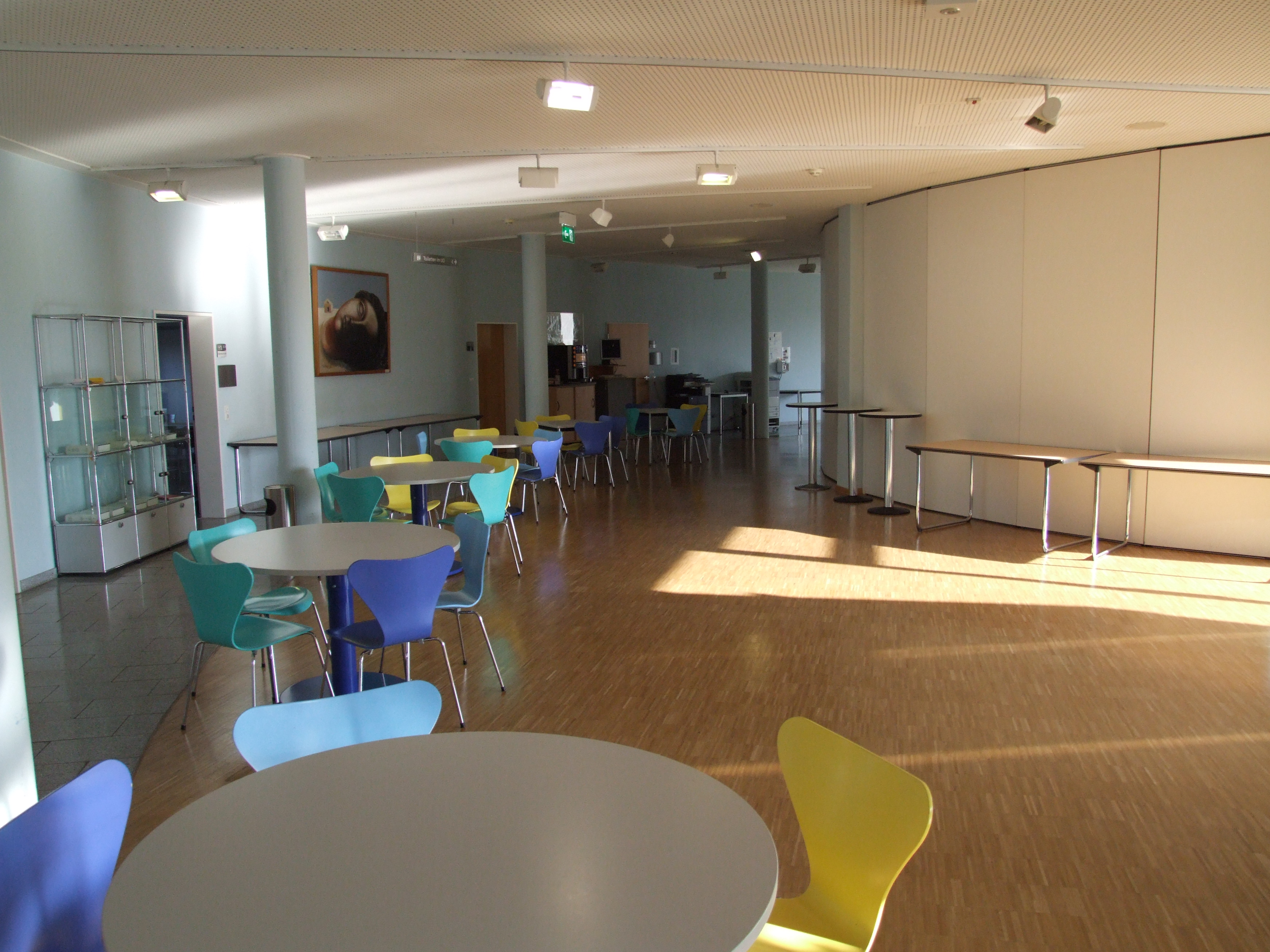
Lobby of the Otto Mayer House

The university offers programs leading to a postgraduate certificate and master's degrees. Furthermore it runs doctoral programs, and administers programs of executive education. The language of instruction is predominantly German, although each year a series of seminar courses offered in cooperation with Indiana University School of Public and Environmental Affairs is delivered in English language. In 2015 the cooperation expanded to include the University of Southern California's Price School of Public Policy. Master's students may earn the European Master of Public Administration diploma by studying an additional semester abroad at one of the twelve partner schools in the EMPA network.

The one-term postgraduate certificate program offers complementary studies in public management. It is aimed at young and future government officials holding a graduate-level degree. It resembles the first semester of the Master of Administrative Sciences program.

The Master of Administrative Sciences (Magister rerum publicarum) is the school's traditional flagship program. It is a one-year postgraduate program open to students holding an additional graduate-level degree, preferably in law, economics, history, or sociology. Students can choose from some 100 courses that are divided into five policy areas: 1. Public tasks, Organization and Proceedings, 2. Public Management, 3. European and International Affairs, 4. State and Economy, and 5. Higher Education and Research Management. The program comprises two terms at the school, an eight-week internship at German or European institutions, and a subsequent period of three months to write the master's thesis and pass an oral examination. International student enrollment in this program regularly hovers around 50 percent.

The Master of Arts in Administrative Sciences is a two-year interdisciplinary program focusing on public administration in an international context. First year students follow a core curriculum consisting of six modules on administrative, legal, economic, methodological, and strategic topics, and complete a mandatory eight-week internship. In the second year, students choose courses from the following six optional modules: 1. Government and Administration, 2. Public Policy, 3. Europeanization and Internationalization of Public Administration, 4. Organization and Personnel, 5. Funding of Public Services, and 6. Competition and Regulation in the Infrastructure Sector. At the end of the second year, students complete the master's thesis.

The Master of Arts in Public Economy is a two-year program dedicated to the study of the public economic sector from an interdisciplinary perspective. During the first year, students follow the core curriculum of the M.A. in Administrative Sciences. Second-year students complete four deepening modules in Public Finance, Competition and Regulation, Procurement, and Public Corporate Governance, choose one optional module on Public Enterprises, or Infrastructure, and write a master's thesis.

Both M.A. programs also offer a one-year option for students holding a previous relevant master's degree. The Master of Public Administration in Higher Education and Research Management is a two-year part-time program for professional university or research institute administrators.

The university runs doctoral programs in administrative sciences (Doctor rerum publicarum), law (Doctor juris), and political sciences and economy (Doctor rerum politicarum). Doctoral candidates are required to complete one year of coursework in residence at the school, and produce a dissertation which makes a creditable contribution to scholarship in its field. The dissertation must be supervised by a member of the faculty.

The school's executive education provides in-service training for senior civil servants of all government levels. The seminars, workshops and conferences deal with contemporary problems of administration, legislation, and European affairs. The Speyer Leadership College (Führungskolleg Speyer) is a two-year in-service program preparing senior executives holding at least the rank of a Government Director to assume higher positions.

== Admission and fees ==
Admission to the school is competitive and is limited to 25 seats per program and year for the M.A. programs, and to 60 seats for the Master in Administrative Sciences program. Formal minimum entry requirement for all degree programs is a class rank among the top third in the previous academic degree program. Professional administrative experience is considered an asset. For prospective international students, a language test for German at CEFR C1 level is required.

The German state heavily subsidizes university study to keep higher education affordable regardless of socio-economic background. Like most German public universities, Speyer charges no tuition fees for academic programs, for both EU and non-EU citizens. For the professional M.P.A. in Higher Education and Research Management program, the school charges €8,000 in tuition. The annual housing costs for on-campus dormitories range from €1,560 to €3,240.

== Research ==
The university performs "fundamental research with high relevance to practice", and regularly publishes treatises on administrative, legal, political, and economic matters in the Speyer University Monograph Series (Schriftenreihe der Hochschule Speyer). With its 17 chairs dedicated to public and constitutional law, administrative sciences, economics, modern and contemporary history, sociology, and political science, the school maintains a strategic partnership with the German Research Institute for Public Administration, which is part of the Leibniz Association, and is located on the campus. It also maintains individual research cooperations with 20 universities in Europe, the Americas, and Asia. It is a member of the European Group of Public Administration (EGPA), the Standing Conference of European Public Service Training Agencies (SCEPSTA), the Transatlantic Policy Consortium (TPC), the National Association of Schools of Public Affairs and Administration (NASPAA), and the International Association of Schools and Institutes of Administration (IASIA).

== Alumni ==
Besides numerous politicians, diplomats, professors, judges, and high-ranking government officials at local, state, federal, and international level, the university's noted alumni and faculty include President of Germany Roman Herzog; Professor Niklas Luhmann, one of the most important social theorists of the 20th century; current Minister of Justice Christine Lambrecht; former Federal Minister and Under-Secretary-General of the United Nations Klaus Töpfer; Federal Minister Wolfgang Bötsch; First Mayor and Prime Minister of Hamburg Christoph Ahlhaus; vice president of the Federal Constitutional Court of Germany Ferdinand Kirchhof; president of the Bundesbank Helmut Schlesinger; president of the Federal Court of Auditors of Germany Dieter Engels; Head of the German Chancellery Waldemar Schreckenberger; president of the Federal Court of Justice of Germany Willi Geiger; president of the Federal Employment Agency of Germany Florian Gerster; Executive Director of the Bundesbank Thilo Sarrazin; Attorney General of Germany Alexander von Stahl; Advocate General at the European Court of Justice Carl Otto Lenz; former CEO and current Chairman of BASF Jürgen Strube; and former CEO of Allianz Global Investors and current Chairman of the Deutsche Börse Group Joachim Faber.

== See also ==
- German Research Institute for Public Administration
