= Maryvonne =

Maryvonne is a French feminine given name. It is a portmanteau of Marie and Yvonne.

== List of people with the given name ==
- Maryvonne Blondin (born 1947), French politician
- Maryvonne Briot (born 1959), French politician
- Maryvonne Dupureur (1937–2008), French middle-distance runner
- Maryvonne de Saint-Pulgent (born 1951), French musicologist
- Maryvonne Huet (born 1936) is a former French figure skater
- Maryvonne Kendergi (1915–2011), Canadian-Armenian writer, professor and musicologist
- Maryvonne Le Brignonen (born 1975), French civil servant
- Maryvonne Pinault, wife of French businessman François Pinault

== See also ==
- Marrevone dialect
