= Robert Deitz =

American lawyer and former intelligence officer

Senior Counsel to the Director of the Central Intelligence Agency
- In office September 2006 – February 2009
- President: George W. Bush; Barack Obama

General Counsel of the National Security Agency
- In office September 1998 – September 2006
- President: George W. Bush

Personal details
- Born: February 7, 1946 (age 80) Philadelphia, Pennsylvania, United States
- Party: Republican
- Spouse: Martina F. Hofmann
- Children: 2
- Education: Harvard Law School (JD); Princeton University (MPA); Middlebury College (BA)
- Occupation: Lawyer

Military service
- Allegiance: United States
- Branch: United States Army
- Years of service: 1968–1970
- Battles/wars: Vietnam War

Robert L. Deitz (born February 7, 1946) is an American lawyer and former intelligence officer who served as senior counsel to the Director of the Central Intelligence Agency and General Counsel of the National Security Agency during the directorships of Michael Hayden. He is a professor of public policy at George Mason University's Schar School of Policy and Government.

== Early life ==
Deitz was born in 1946 in Philadelphia and raised in Gettysburg, Pennsylvania. He attended Middlebury College for his undergraduate degree in English, graduating cum laude, Phi Beta Kappa. Upon graduation he was drafted into the United States Army where he earned the Army Commendation Medal. After fulfilling his commitment as a soldier, Deitz left the service to earn his Master of Public Administration from Princeton University's Woodrow Wilson School, where he studied international politics and economics, before pursuing a Juris Doctor at Harvard Law School. At Harvard, Deitz was the Supreme Court Note and Note Editor of the Harvard Law Review and graduated magna cum laude.

During law school he clerked for Supreme Court Associate Justice William O. Douglas and after Douglas' retirement, for Justices Potter Stewart and Byron White. Upon graduation, Deitz joined the Carter administration, serving as Special Assistant to Secretary of Health, Education and Welfare Joseph Califano and later then-Deputy Secretary of State Warren Christopher. After his first stint in public service, Deitz entered private practice.

As a lawyer, he was admitted to the U.S. Supreme Court Bar, every Circuit of the United States Court of Appeals including the D.C. Circuit, U.S. Tax Court, the United States District Court for the District of Columbia, and United States District Court for the District of Maryland.

== Intelligence career ==
In September 1998, Deitz left a partner position in private practice at the Washington, D.C. office of international law firm Perkins Coie to return to public service to head the Office of the General Counsel, or D2 at the National Security Agency, responsible for representing the agency in all legal matters. During his stint at NSA, Deitz variously held concurrent dual-hat positions as acting General Counsel at the National Geospatial-Intelligence Agency and acting Deputy General Counsel, Intelligence, at the Department of Defense. While at NSA the agency's legal burdens were heavily focused on the warrantless surveillance programs later exposed by Edward Snowden in 2013. On Snowden's allegations that while at NSA officers "at any time can target anyone, any selector, anywhere,” or "wiretap anyone from you or your accountant to a federal judge to even the president if I had a personal email”, Deitz called the claim a “complete and utter” falsehood. In the Los Angeles Times, Deitz said "First of all it’s illegal, there is enormous oversight. They have keystroke auditing. There are, from time to time, cases in which some analyst is [angry] at his ex-wife and looks at the wrong thing and he is caught and fired”

After the USA Freedom Act was signed into law by President Obama in 2014 as a compromise between civil libertarian demands and security hawk efforts to preserve certain spying tools, Deitz expressed skepticism that the legislation would offer much anything in the way of reform in either direction, saying "it’s being talked about like it’s the Declaration of Independence or something, these adjustments are marginal.”

Deitz left the NSA with Director Michael Hayden in September 2006 to follow his boss to the Central Intelligence Agency, where Hayden became Director, and Deitz served as Senior Counselor to the Director. At CIA, Deitz was Director Hayden's personal legal advisor, a role distinct from his previous position at NSA where he oversaw all legal affairs of the agency.

Deitz has been a critic of journalistic standards for publication of classified information. At a meeting of the American Bar Association meeting in Washington, D.C. he delivered harsh criticism of industry practices saying “we need serious reviews by the editors of the newspapers about what they publish... giving more credit to people in these positions of authority, people such as the heads of NSA, CIA, DIA, and so forth — that these aren’t a bunch of corrupt pols who are trying to keep secrets simply to cover their careers, that these are well-intended people who are deeply concerned about keeping the American people safe.”

== Academia ==
Both Deitz and Hayden left public service at the end of the Bush Administration, retiring from the CIA in February 2009. Soon after their departure, both joined the faculty of George Mason University's Schar School of Policy and Government. For Deitz this was just a more permanent role as he had already been teaching at George Mason since 2006 as Distinguished CIA Officer-In-Residence while at the agency.

Deitz also currently serves on the Faculty Advisory Board of the Michael V. Hayden Center for Intelligence, Policy, and National Security, a think tank at George Mason University's Schar School founded by his former boss Michael Hayden.

== Controversy ==
Deitz's teaching at George Mason was the subject of criticism from Ken Silverstein of The Intercept, who argued that Deitz was unfit to teach courses on ethical challenges in public policy on accord of his legal work in defense of NSA warrantless surveillance programs and what Silverstein claimed was a politically motivated investigation Deitz conducted into former CIA Inspector General John Helgerson's review of the agency's extraordinary rendition, black sites, and enhanced interrogation practices at the behest of Director Michael Hayden.

== Political affiliations ==
In the 2016 presidential elections Deitz supported the campaign of Republican candidate Carly Fiorina, and contrasted her foreign policy positions with those of then-candidate Donald Trump in a debate with Trump Campaign surrogate Peter Navarro on CNBC.

== Personal life ==
Deitz is married to Martina Hofmann and resides in the Old Town neighborhood of Alexandria, Virginia. He is Lutheran.

== Published works ==
- "Congratulations – You Just Got Hired: Don’t Screw It Up", 2013.
