= EMPA (disambiguation) =

EMPA or Empa may refer to:

- Swiss Federal Laboratories for Materials Science and Technology (German: Eidgenössische Materialprüfungs- und Forschungsanstalt)
- European Master of Public Administration Consortium
- EMPA (drug)
- Electron micro probe analyzer (EMPA)
- Euro-Mediterranean Parliamentary Assembly

== Geography ==
- Empa, Cyprus, a community of Cyprus
