= Mark J. Rozell =

- Occupations: Dean, Schar School of Policy and Government; Ruth D. and John T. Hazel chair in public policy

Academic background
- Education: Rochester Institute of Technology BA, University of Virginia MA, PhD
- Website: https://schar.gmu.edu/about/faculty-directory/mark-j-rozell

Mark J. Rozell is a political scientist. He is the dean and Ruth D. and John T. Hazel chair in public policy at the Schar School of Policy and Government of George Mason University. His research concerns various topics in United States politics and government such as executive privilege, the presidency, the intersection of religion and politics, and federalism, among other topics.

== Education and career ==
Rozell received his BA from Rochester Institute of Technology in 1982. He went on to complete an MA in public administration at the University of Virginia in 1983, and a PhD from the same institution in 1987.

Among his books are Executive Privilege: Presidential Power, Secrecy, and Accountability (2020, University Press of Kansas), and the co-written volumes The Unitary Executive: A Danger to Constitutional Government (2020, University Press of Kansas), Federalism: A Very Short Introduction (2019, Oxford University Press), and The South and the Transformation of US Politics (2019, Oxford University Press).

Rozell contributes frequent opinion columns and commentary to major US media such as the Baltimore Sun, New York Daily News, The Hill, and Politico. He writes a twice monthly column on Virginia politics for the Washington Post.
