= Ferdinand Mélin-Soucramanien =

French professor of law

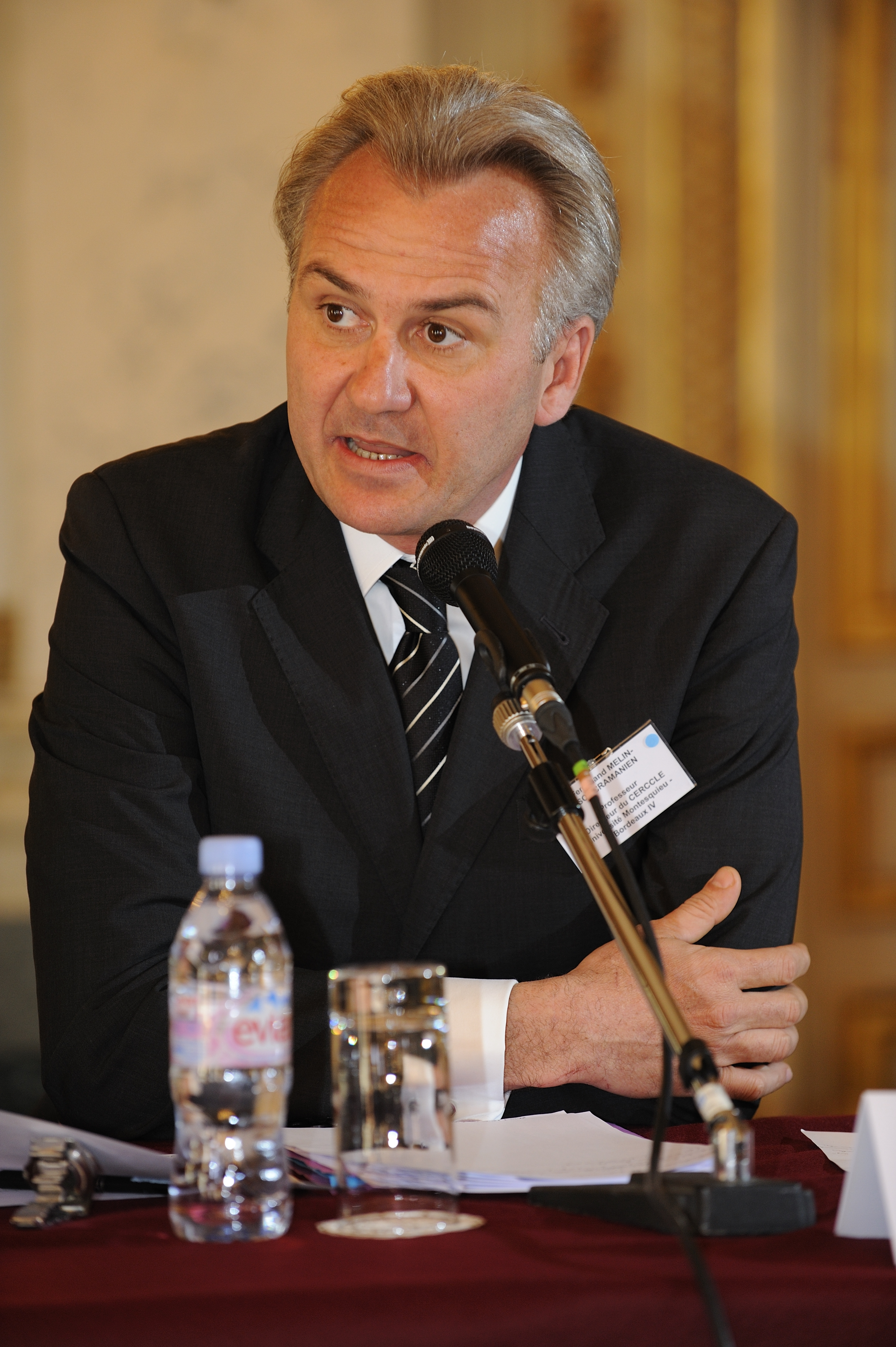
Ferdinand Mélin-Soucramanien

Ferdinand Mélin-Soucramanien is a French professor of law.

He was appointed President of the Institut national du service public (INSP) in 2022 by President Emmanuel Macron.

== Education and early career ==
Born on February 10, 1966, in Aix-en-Provence he studied Literature in Réunion then the Law before becoming a doctor of law at Aix-Marseille University and then a lecturer there. He was also professor of Constitutional law at University of Bordeaux IV.

After a thesis in 1996 about the "Principle of equality in decisions of Constitutional Council" for which he received a prize of Constitutional Council. He received the Agrégation of Law in 1998.
