= European Master of Public Administration Consortium =

European network of public administration schools

The European Master of Public Administration Consortium (EMPA) is a network of European schools offering leading master's programs in public administration. Established in 1990–1991, it has developed one of the first multilateral exchange programs for students and scholars of public administration, and issues a joint diploma upon completion of the program.

== Members ==
Belgium

- KU Leuven
- UCLouvain

Estonia

- Tallinn University of Technology

Finland

- University of Vaasa

France

- Institut d'Études politiques de Lyon
- Institut d'Études politiques de Paris (Sciences Po)

Germany

- German University of Administrative Sciences Speyer
- University of Konstanz

Hungary

- Corvinus University of Budapest

Ireland

- University of Limerick

Netherlands

- Leiden University
- Erasmus University Rotterdam

Switzerland

- University of Geneva

United Kingdom

- University of Liverpool

== See also ==
- National Association of Schools of Public Affairs and Administration
