= Gerd Roellecke =

- Born: 13 March 1927; Iserlohn, North Rhine-Westphalia, Germany
- Died: 30 October 2011 (aged 84)
- Education: University of Freiburg, University of Würzburg, University of Düsseldorf
- Awards: Merit Cross 1st Class and honorary member of the German Research Institute for Public Administration
- Scientific career
- Fields: Law, Economics
- Workplaces: University of Mainz, University of Mannheim

Gerd Roellecke (born 13 July 1927 in Iserlohn, North Rhine-Westphalia, Germany – died 30 October 2011 in Karlsruhe, Baden-Württemberg, Germany) was a German legal scholar, and lawyer. He was professor for public law and philosophy at the University of Mannheim from 1969 to 1999. He served as rector between 1982 and 1985.

== Early life ==
Gerd Roellecke was born in 1927 as the son of businessman Wilhelm Roellecke, and was baptised a Roman Catholic. He served as a soldier from 1943 to 1945 during the Second World War. He graduated from high school in 1947. From 1948 to 1952, Roellecke studied economics and law at the Universities of Würzburg and Freiburg im Breisgau where he earned his first Staatsexamen. He then went on to complete his second Staatsexamen at the University of Düsseldorf. In 1960, Roellecke achieved his doctorate with a thesis exploring the limits of the judicial power held by the Federal Constitutional Court.

From 1966 to 1969, he held the role of research assistant at the Federal Constitutional Court in Karlsruhe, before completing his habilitation and a further thesis at the University of Mainz discussing the concept of positive law and its relation to the Basic Law of the Federal Republic of Germany.

== Career ==
Later in 1969, Roellecke was appointed professor at the University of Mannheim, where he acceded to the chair for public law and legal philosophy, a post he held until his retirement in 1995.

Whilst at the University he served as vice-rector from 1970 to 1973. From August 1972 to July 1974 he served as President of the West German Rectors' Conference. He served as rector from 1982 to 1985.

Roellecke wrote reviews for Frankferter Allgemeine Zeitung.

== Legacy ==
He died on 30 October 2011, and an obituary was published that began with a quote from German sociologist Niklas Luhmann: "Everything could be different - and I can change almost nothing."

Other professional accomplishments include his membership in the Clausewitz Society.

In 1999 he received the Merit Cross 1st Class and became honorary member of the German Research Institute for Public Administration in 2001.

== Publications ==
- Patrick Bahners, Gerd Roellecke (Hrsg.): Preußische Stile : ein Staat als Kunststück, Stuttgart : Klett-Cotta 2001, ISBN 3-608-94290-4.
- Über immanente Grenzen der richterlichen Gewalt des Bundesverfassungsgerichtes, Freiburg im Breisgau 1960, zugl. Diss., Univ. Freiburg 1960.
- Der Begriff des positiven Gesetzes und das Grundgesetz, Mainz 1969, zugl. Habil.-Schrift, Univ. Mainz 1969.
- Verfassungsgebende Gewalt als Ideologie, in: JZ 1992, S. 929 bis 934.
- Die Entkoppelung von Recht und Religion, in: JZ 2004, S. 105 bis 110.
- Religion - Recht - Kultur und die Eigenwilligkeit der Systeme: Überarbeitete Fassung eines Vortrags gehalten vor der „Juristischen Gesellschaft zu Berlin“ am 9. Mai 2007, De Gruyter Recht, Berlin 2007, ISBN 978-3-89949-454-9.

== See also ==
- List of University of Mannheim people
- List of University of Mainz people
- University of Mannheim
- Karlsruhe
- Baden-Württemberg
