= Stuart S. Malawer =

American international trade lawyer and professor

Stuart Malawer
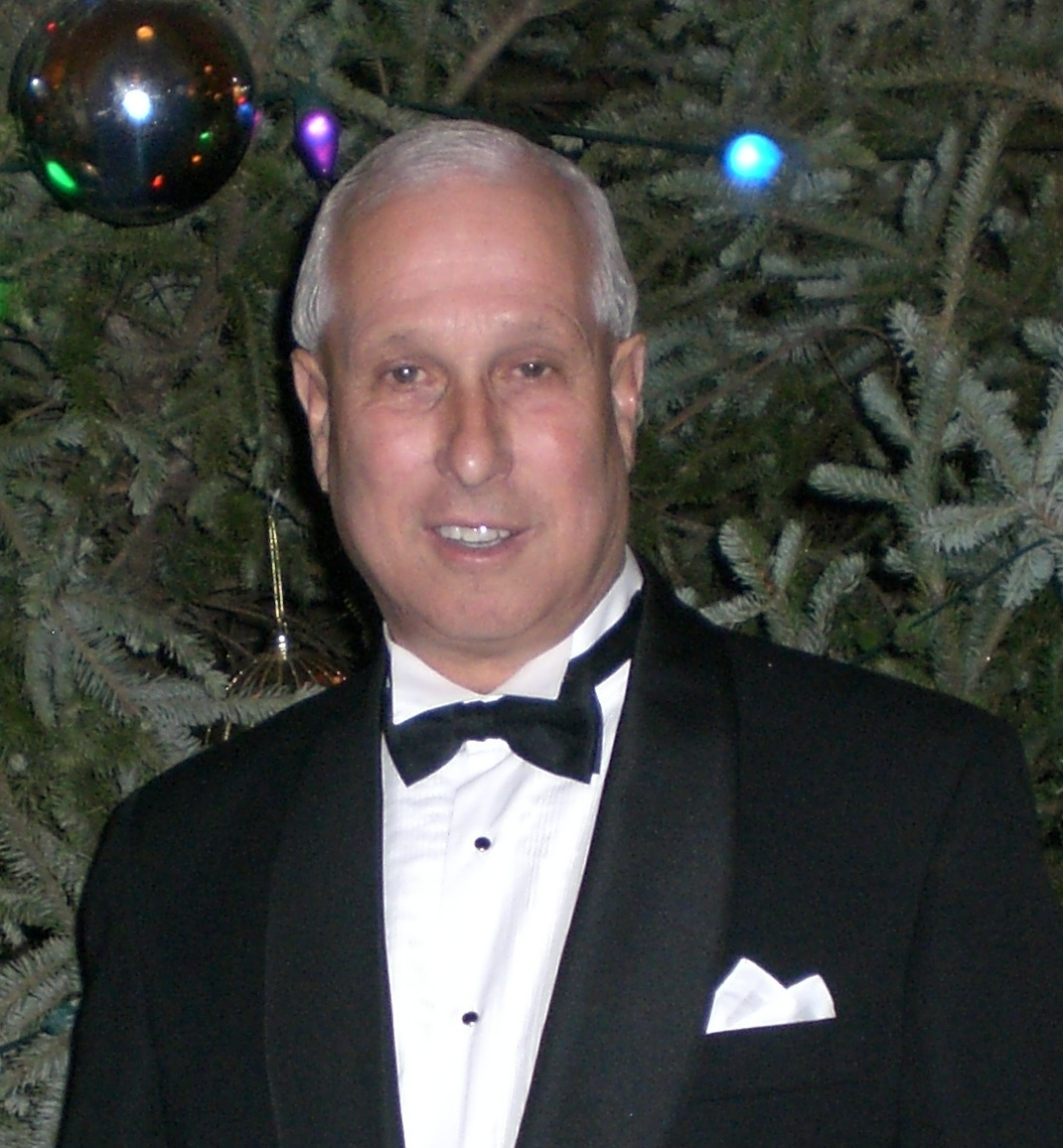
- Dr. Stuart Malawer
- Occupation: Professor of Law and International Trade

Academic background
- Education: UPenn Wharton, PhD Cornell Law School, J.D. University at Buffalo, B.A.

Academic work
- Discipline: International Trade Law
- Institutions: George Mason University's Schar School of Policy and Government and Antonin Scalia Law School

Stuart Malawer is an international trade lawyer and distinguished service professor of law and international trade emeritus at George Mason University's Schar School of Policy and Government. He was a founding faculty member of both the Antonin Scalia Law School and the Schar School of Policy and Government at George Mason University. Dr. Malawer has received many professional awards, i including the Joint Resolution of the Virginia General Assembly for Public Service, the Virginia Supreme Court's Pro Bono Award, the Virginia State Bar's International Lawyer Award (Hardy Cross Dillard Award) and the GMU Distinguished Faculty Member of the Year Award (Teaching & Research). Recent Resume. He ranks in the top 1.4% of 2.7m SSRN authors.

== Education ==
Malawer completed an undergraduate degree at the University at Buffalo before attending Cornell Law School for his JD, and later the Wharton School at the University of Pennsylvania for a PhD in International Relations. He conducted research on international law and foreign policy at the Foreign Policy Research Institute (FPRI). He also earned a diploma from the Research Centre of The Hague Academy of International Law in the Netherlands, and studied at St Peter's College, Oxford and the Harvard Law School.

== Legal work ==
Malawer served as an international expert in the areas of trade law and foreign policy, testifying before international organizations, including the World Trade Organization. He also served as an arbitrator for the American Arbitration Association (International Panel) Dr. Malawer has published widely in the fields of international law, national security, foreign policy and international trade.

Malawer formerly served as Chairman of the International Practice Section of the Virginia State Bar. In 2009, he was named to the Board of Directors of the Virginia Economic Development Partnership by Virginia Governor Tim Kaine and confirmed by the Virginia General Assembly. In addition, he was later appointed by Virginia Governor Terry McAuliffe and reappointed by Virginia Governor Ralph Northam to the Virginia Committee on International Trade at the VEDP. He has worked with or appointed to state boards or trade delegations by both Republican and Democratic governors of Virginia since 1988.

He is a member of the Virginia State Bar, the New York State Bar and the Washington, D.C.

== Academic career ==
He is currently the Distinguished Service Professor of Law & International Trade Emeritus at the Schar School of Policy and Government at George Mason University. He is widely recognized and frequently published as an expert in international trade law. In 1976 Malawer became a founding faculty member of the George Mason School of Law (today the Antonin Scalia Law School) and subsequently the Schar School of Public Policy.

He is the founder and former director of the Graduate International Transactions Program at George Mason University. After its establishment this program became one of the largest graduate programs at George Mason University. It just celebrated 35 year reunion. and recently supervised two leading Chinese law and trade scholars at GMU.

He is the founder and former director of the St. Peters - George Mason Oxford Trade Program. https://globaltraderelations.net/images/Oxford_-_Geneva_Trade_Programs_Photos_1994-2003.pdf Where he was visiting professor at St. Peter's College, Oxford University He has previously taught at the Wharton School and the Harvard International Tax Program. He was a Visiting Scholar at Georgetown's Institute of International and Foreign Trade Law.

He was the American editor of the Korean published China and WTO Review. He authors for the journal semi-annual commentaries on US and international legal aspects of US-China trade relations. He is often interviewed on global TV on tariffs and global trade.

== Awards ==
Numerous published commentaries (on law, trade, national security) in leading newspapers for many years.

Two Awards (GMU 2000 and Virginia General Assembly 2024).

Distinguished Faculty Member of the Year - George Mason University.

Annual Award for Pro Bono Service (Virginia Supreme Court (2025).

Hardy Cross Dillard Award (Virginia State Bar) (International Practice Section). https://www.vsb.org/site/sections/internationalpractice

Distinguished Service Award (Virginia State Bar) (Virginia Lawyer). https://www.vsb.org/

Malawer-Paden Founders Scholarship. https://www.gmu.edu/

Interview of International Lawyer Stuart S. Malawer (JEAIL 2018)

Stuart Malawer -- 46 Years at George Mason University Ceremony (2021).

Stuart Malawer -- Joint Resolution of Virginia Assembly and GMU Retirement (April 2024).

In Honor of 46 Years at George Mason University (2024).

In Honor of Legal Career (56 Years) (2024).

Joint Resolution of the Virginia General Assembly in Recognition of Excellence in Public Service and University Education (2024).

== Publications ==
"Opinion Articles in Legal and News Publications (1995-2025)."

"Supreme Court and Trump's Tariffs." (2026).(Jounral of East Asia and International Law 2026).

"Editorials on International Trade, International Law & Virginia in the Richmond Times-Dispatch (2011-2025)."

"Tariffs, Trade and Trump -- Run Up to the 2024 US Presidential Election (Trump 2.0)" (Journal of East Asia and International Law 2024).

"Trump and Biden Trade Policies -- Has the U.S. Become a National Security and Protectionist Trading State?" (Journal of East Asia and International Law 2024)

"Tectonic Changes in US Law and US-China Trade Relations." (China and WTO Review 2023).

"The US Trade Relations with China: Worrisome Developments in US Law." (China and WTO Review 2023).

"Biden's Trade Policies -- Year One: Same as Trump's or More Aggressive?" (China and WTO Review 2022).

TRUMP AND TRADE -- POLICY AND LAW (HeinOnline 2021).

"Biden, National Security, Law and Global Trade: Less Subterfuge and More Strategy." (China and WTO Review 2021).

"Trump, Recent Court Cases and the 2020 Presidential Election." (China and WTO Review 2020).

"Trump, Litigation and Threats: From Queens to the World Stage." (China and WTO Review 2020).

Trump, Trade and Federal Courts. (China and WTO Review 2019).

Trump's Tariff Wars and National Security (China and WTO Review 2018).

Trump's One-Year Trade Policies. (China and WTO Review 2018).

Trump's China Trade Policies (China and WTO Review 2017).

Global Trade and International Law (Hein and Company, 2013).

U.S. National Security Law and Policy (Hein and Company, 2009).

WTO Law, Litigation and Policy (Hein and Company, 2007).

Essays on International Law.(Hein and Company, 1986).

Federal Regulation of International Business (5 volumes) (U.S. Chamber of Commerce and Georgetown University) (1981–1983).

Studies in International Law.(Hein and Company 1977).

Imposed Treaties and International Law. (Hein and Company 1977).
