= Institut national du service public =

French grande école

National Institute of Public Service
- Institut national du service public
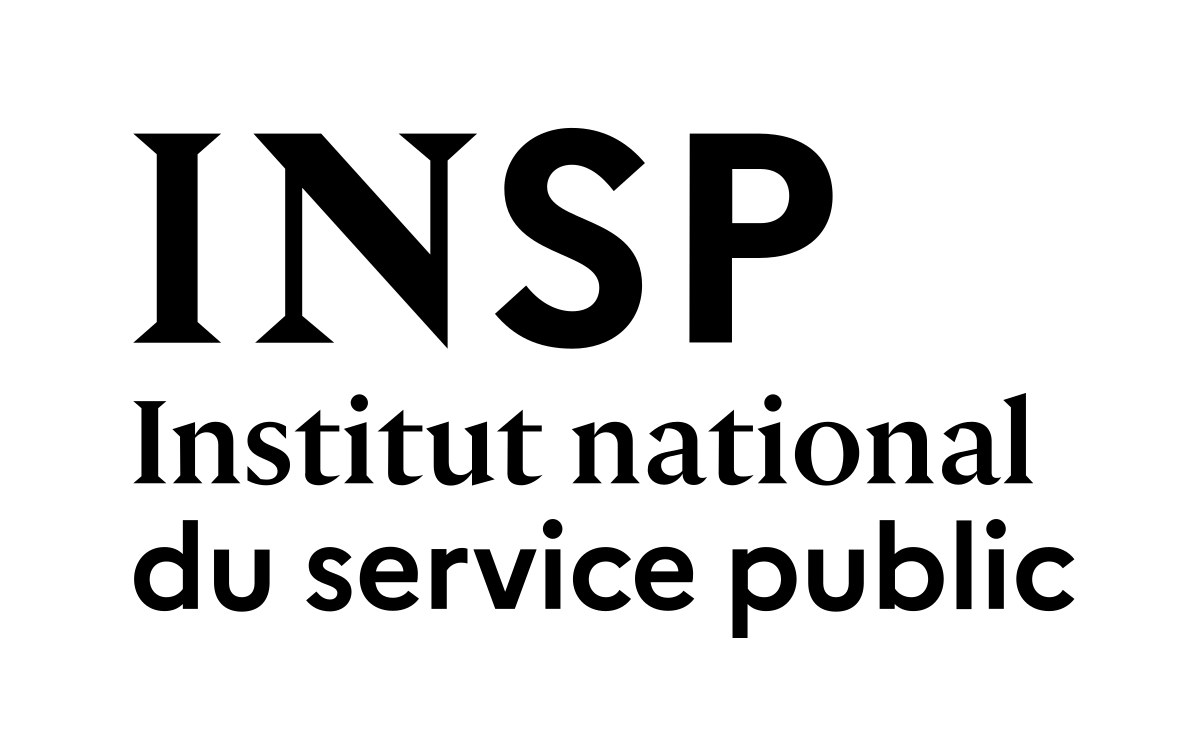
- Type: Public graduate school, grande école
- Established: January 1, 2022; 4 years ago
- Founder: Emmanuel Macron
- Parent institution: PSL University
- Academic affiliations: Conférence des Grandes écoles Transatlantic Policy Consortium
- Budget: €45.562.451 million
- President: Ferdinand Mélin-Soucramanien
- Director: Maryvonne Le Brignonen
- Location: Strasbourg and Paris, France
- Language: French
- Website: insp.gouv.fr

The Institut national du service public (INSP; English: National Institute of Public Service) is a grande école based in Strasbourg, France. It is dedicated to the recruitment, initial training and continuing training of senior executives and civil servants of the state. It was created on 1 January 2022 to replace the École nationale d'administration (ENA), which was abolished on 31 December 2021 by French President Emmanuel Macron.

The INSP is seated in Strasbourg and has offices in Paris. Its establishment is part of the top management reforms introduced by President Macron aiming at achieving a more efficient, inclusive and attractive top administration. However, its creation has faced criticisms from many French civil servants, including Macron's former Prime Minister Édouard Philippe.

The institute is responsible for providing senior state executives with initial and continuing training based on new foundations. It oversees a common core program that trains senior executives from all three branches of public service and the judicial magistracy, to ensure common references, improve public action and better serve French citizens.

The institute's mission, as a training centre for top executives and managers, is to build academic partnerships (in France and abroad) and to develop France's international influence, which includes taking foreign students and welcoming foreign auditors.

== History ==
The École nationale d'administration (ENA) attracted much criticism and the question of its abolition was regularly raised since the 1970s.

President Emmanuel Macron took the formal decision to abolish it in 2019, despite the opposition of his Prime Minister Édouard Philippe and his chief of staff, Benoît Ribadeau-Dumas, both from the Council of State. Initially planned for April 15, 2019, the announcement was made ten days later due to the fire at Notre-Dame Cathedral in Paris.

On April 8, 2021, President Emmanuel Macron officially confirmed, during a speech to civil service executives, the creation of the new Institut national du service public, which will become, in a way, the crucible for the training of civil service executives.

The ordinance no. 2021-702 of June 2, 2021 reforming the senior management of the state civil service creates the INSP, a new national administrative public establishment. The decree regulating the operation of the National Institute of Public Service (INSP) was published on December 1, 2021.

The National Institute of Public Service (INSP) was officially inaugurated by the Prime Minister Jean Castex on January 28, 2022, in Strasbourg.

== Campuses ==
=== Strasbourg ===
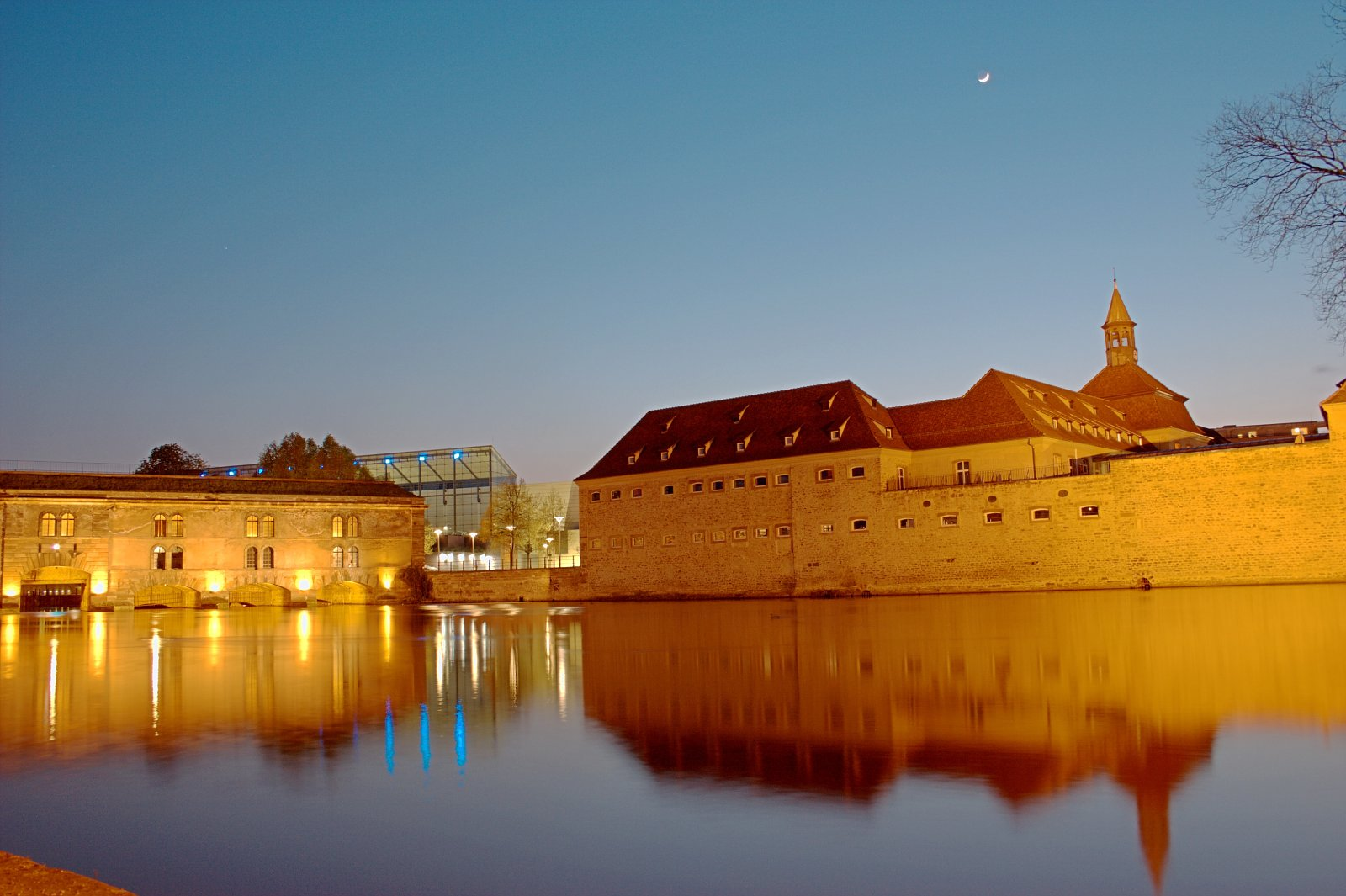
Commanderie Saint-Jean, home of the INSP in Strasbourg

The National Institute of Public Service is located at 1 rue Sainte-Marguerite, in Strasbourg, in the former Saint-Jean commandery. These premises were occupied by the École nationale d'administration (ENA) from 1991 to 2021.

=== Paris ===
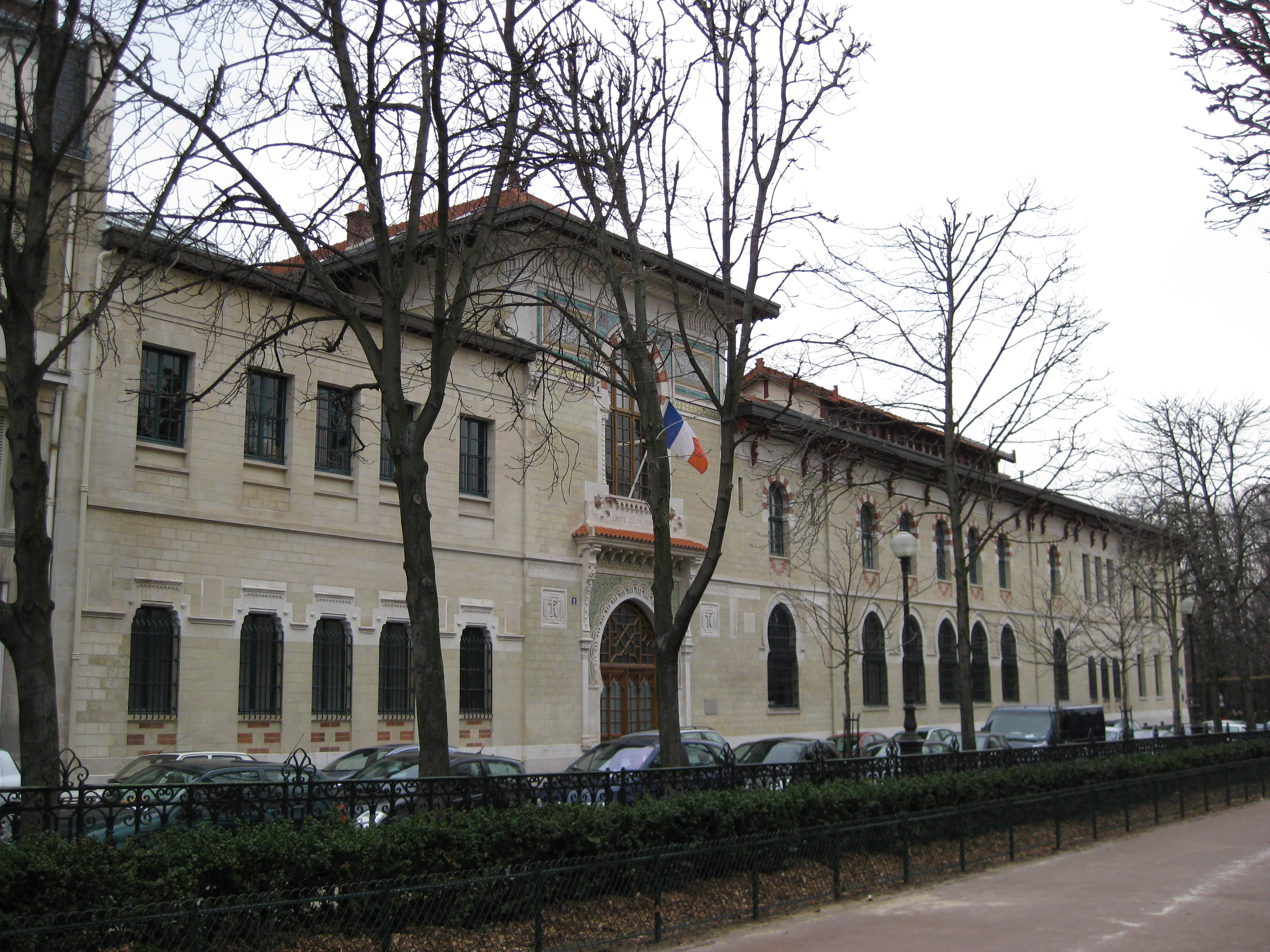
INSP premises in Paris

The INSP also has a Parisian branch, located on avenue de l'Observatoire, in premises previously occupied by the National School of Overseas France, International Institute of Public Administration and the École nationale d'administration (ENA) until 2021.

== Competitions ==
Students are selected after a bachelor's degree with different competitions depending on the candidate's profile.

Five entrance exams coexist at the National Institute of Public Service. They allow diverse profiles to integrate the initial training cycle of the INSP.

- External competition: Open to holders of a bac+3 level diploma, or an equivalent qualification.
- Special external competition (Talents): Introduced in 2021, it is reserved for the most deserving scholarship students and job seekers, students in a "public service talents" preparatory class. Students in this competition are "dual-registered", being also registered in the external competition;
- External "doctors" competition: Open to holders of a doctorate. Each year, a decree specifies a specialty for the tests.
- Internal competition: Intended for public officials who can demonstrate four years of professional experience, without qualification requirements.
- Third competition: Aimed at workers in the private sector, players in the associative world and local elected officials, with eight years of professional experience, without qualification requirements.

The competitions take place in two stages, with eligibility tests (up to five written tests) and then admission tests (up to five oral tests).

From 2024, the format of the tests will evolve, aiming to make the selection process less academic and more professional. The number of oral tests is reduced, but the weight of their coefficient is increased.

== Academics ==
=== Training ===
The training offer of the National Institute of Public Service (INSP) is a continuation of that of the ENA. It includes:

- Initial training: Open to winners of the entrance exams, aimed at training senior French civil servants. Lasting 21 months, it includes an internship phase (internationally and in France) and a schooling phase.
- Continuing training: Open to civil service executives.
- Diploma courses: 2 masters and 2 specialized masters accredited by the Conference of grandes écoles.

=== Course ===
The course of education for students in initial training is divided into two phases:

- Internship phase: Student civil servants complete an international internship (in French embassies, in European institutions or in international organizations), a local internship (in prefectures, in Mainland France or in Overseas France) and an internship in the SMEs.
- Schooling phase: Student civil servants follow courses aimed at preparing them for the exercise of administrative and managerial responsibilities. During their schooling phase, civil servant students in initial training are joined by foreign students and by officers from the National Gendarmerie and the French Army.

The duration of the course is 21 months for the students of 2022-23 and 2023-24 classes. From January 2024, the course will be extended to 24 months.

== Objectives ==
The institute's main objectives are to:

- Organize preparation courses for the entrance exams to the senior civil service and European organizations;
- Organize the institute's entrance exams;
- Ensure the initial training of civil servant students who have passed the entrance exams, in conjunction with other public service schools or ministries' training departments;
- Oversee and coordinate courses which aim to develop a common culture in public action and to open up the administration. These courses will be designed in conjunction with other public service schools, ministries' training departments or organizations in charge of continuing education;
- Implement a range of continuing professional and top-quality training - often resulting in a diploma or certification - intended for people working or likely to work as government executives or for those wishing to access management positions;
- Carry out and fund research activities related to public services;
- Enhance the influence of the French administration's research, training, and expertise in Europe and worldwide.

== Ranking ==
University and college rankings

Global – Overall
- CWUR World: 191

In 2023, INSP was ranked #191 among the universities around the world by the Center for World University Rankings (CWUR).

== Alumni association ==
The ENA alumni association (AAEENA) has changed its name to become SERVIR. This association brings together former students of the ENA and INSP. It was created in 1947 by the first promotion of the ENA. Currently it consists of 11,000 alumni from 117 countries around the world.

== See also ==
- Grandes écoles
- Higher education in France
- Grands corps de l'État
- French Civil Service
