= Maryvonne Le Brignonen =

French civil servant (born 1975)

Director of the Institut national du service public
- Incumbent
- Assumed office 1 January 2022
- Preceded by: Position established

Personal details
- Born: 30 April 1975 (age 50)

Maryvonne Le Brignonen (born 30 April 1975) is a French civil servant who has been serving as director of the Institut national du service public since 2022. In 2021, she served as director of the École nationale d'administration. From 2019 to 2021, she served as director of Tracfin.
