= Schar School of Policy and Government =

Public policy school of George Mason University

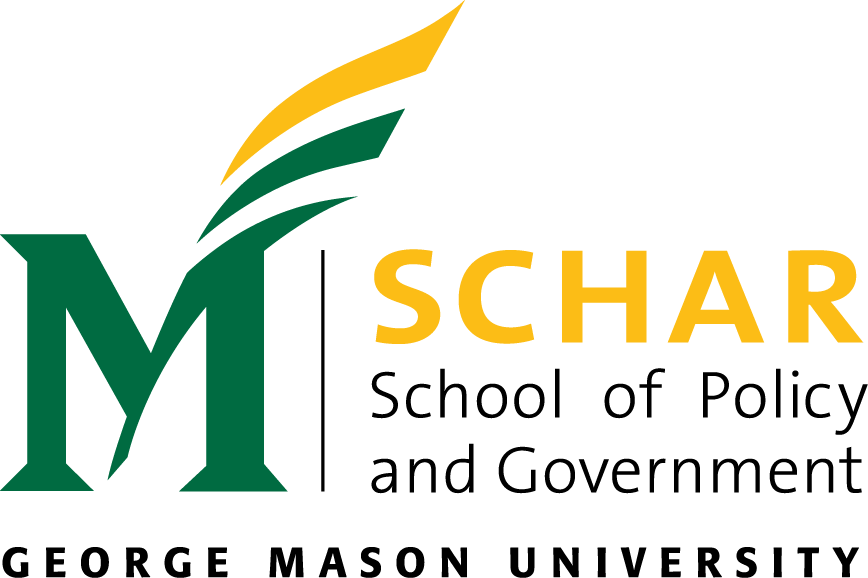
- Schar School Logo
- Former names: George Mason University School of Policy, Government, and International Affairs
- Motto: A Dynamic Education for an Evolving World
- Type: Public policy school
- Established: 1990 (Note: Establishment, Merger, and Renaming Timeline: 1990 (public policy research institute / think tank) → 1990 (undergraduate and graduate Department of Public and International Affairs) → 2000 (graduate section of the School of Public Policy) → 2014 (undergraduate section of the School of Public Policy) → 2014 (merger of the School of Public Policy and the Department of Public and International Affairs into the School of Policy, Government, and International Affairs) → 2016 (renamed to the Schar School of Policy and Government).)
- Parent institution: George Mason University
- Accreditation: NASPAA; APSIA; SACSCOC
- Academic affiliations: TPC
- Budget: $18 million
- Dean: Mark J. Rozell
- Academic staff: 80
- Students: 2,000
- Location: Arlington County, Virginia, U.S. 38.884622°N 77.100731°W
- Campus: Urban (Arlington) Suburban (Fairfax)
- Website: schar.gmu.edu
- Location of the Virginia Square campus in the Washington metropolitan area

The Schar School of Policy and Government (SSPG and formerly the George Mason University School of Policy, Government, and International Affairs or SPGIA) is the public policy school of George Mason University, a public research university in the Commonwealth of Virginia near Washington, D.C.

== History ==
=== 20th century ===
The public policy section of the school was founded as a think tank and public policy research institute in 1990 and evolved into a graduate-only School of Public Policy in 2000; while the generalist political science and international affairs section was founded in 1990 as the Department of Public and International Affairs in the College of Humanities and Social Sciences.

=== 21st century ===
In August 2014, the School of Public Policy began providing public policy and public administration education at the undergraduate level, then merged with the Undergraduate and Graduate Department of Public and International Affairs (then a department of the College of Humanities and Social Sciences’) to form the George Mason University School of Policy, Government, and International Affairs.

In May 2016, the school was renamed the Schar School of Policy and Government in recognition of a $10 million gift from businessman and philanthropist Dwight Schar.

In 2016, the Schar School announced it would partner with The Washington Post to conduct political polling. The Washington Post-Schar School polls correctly predicted that Hillary Clinton would win Virginia in the 2016 presidential race, Democrat Doug Jones would win Alabama's 2017 senatorial race, and Democrat Ralph Northam would win Virginia's 2017 gubernatorial election.

=== Accreditation ===
The Schar School is accredited by the Network of Schools of Public Policy, Affairs, and Administration and is a member of the Transatlantic Policy Consortium for its education programs in public policy and public administration; for its education programs in international relations it is accredited by the Association of Professional Schools of International Affairs (APSIA) . It receives approximately $2 million in sponsored funding for academic research annually. The school's budget was $18 million for the 2019–2020 academic year.

== Campus ==
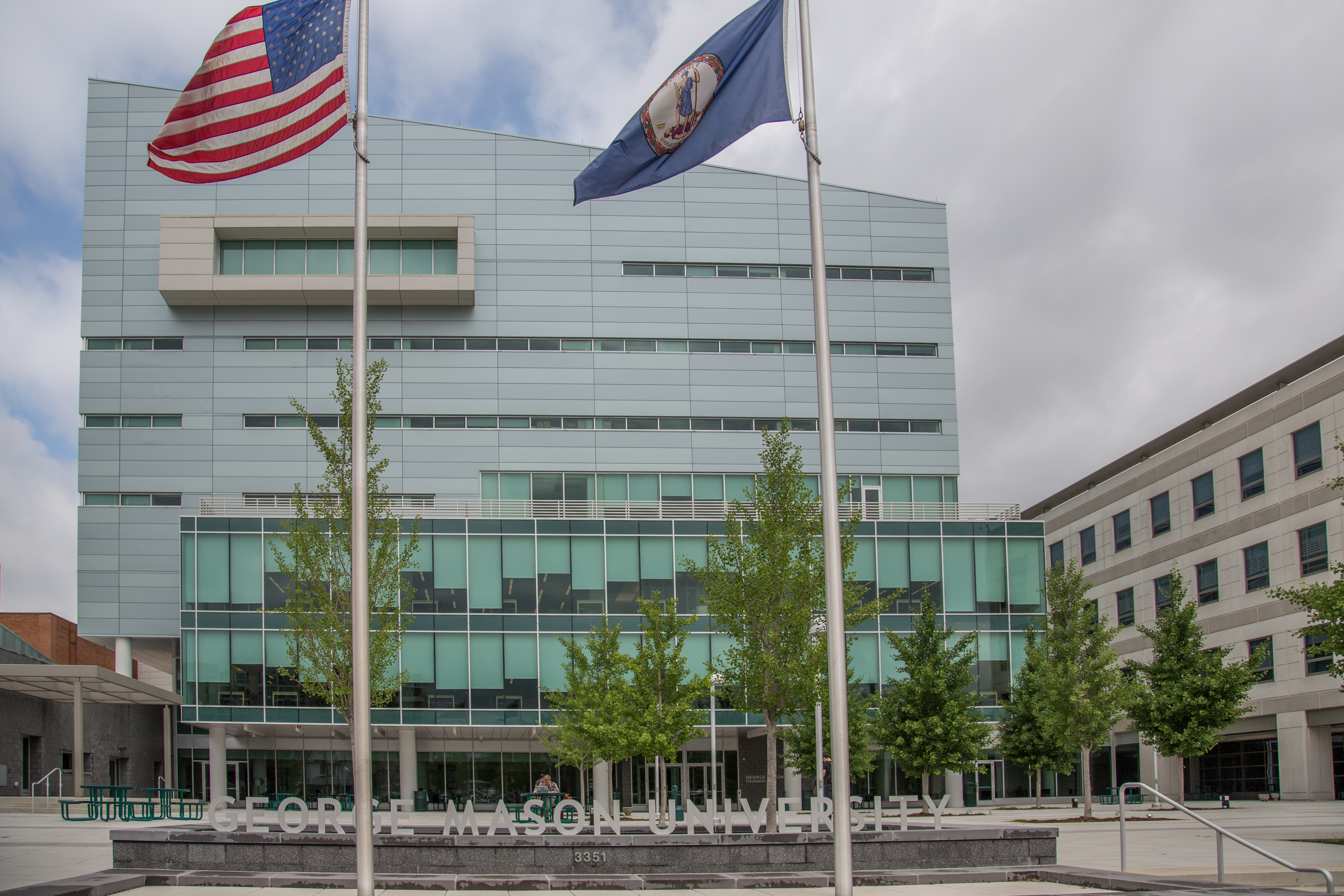
Schar School Headquarters at Van Metre Hall in Virginia Square in Arlington County, Virginia

The school's primary campus is in the Virginia Square neighborhood of Arlington, Virginia, with the headquarters in Van Metre Hall; roughly 4 miles (6.4 km) west of Washington, D.C. Undergraduate programs offered by the school are primarily held at the university's flagship campus in Fairfax, Virginia, with night school offerings in both Arlington and Fairfax. In 2013, political scientist Mark J. Rozell became Acting Dean, taking over the role in a permanent capacity in 2016. During his tenure the school has averaged 80 faculty and a student body of approximately 2,000. The school completed the 244,000 sq ft academic headquarters, Van Metre Hall, in 2010. In 2020 the school began a $250 million expansion directly adjacent, as part of the Commonwealth of Virginia's bid to locate Amazon HQ2 in the nearby National Landing neighborhood.

The headquarters of the Schar School and most of its non-traditional student and graduate programs are located in Arlington, Virginia. The Arlington campus was once the site of the now-defunct Kann's Department Store, and the property was acquired as the location for the university's law school by the Commonwealth of Virginia in 1979.

The Arlington campus consists of a 256,000-square-foot academic building with a 300-seat auditorium, a 5,600-square-foot multipurpose room, a library and an outdoor public plaza. As part of its successful bid to bring Amazon's HQ2 to Virginia, the state committed up to $125 million over the next 20 years to expand the Arlington campus with an emphasis on research and technology.

== Academics ==
=== Education and research ===
The school offers bachelor's as well as graduate degrees in political science along with specialized education through graduate certificates, master's, and doctoral degree programs. It also provides executive education programs.

==== Think tanks, polling, and specialized coursework ====
The School of Policy and Government also cooperates with the Antonin Scalia Law School's National Security Institute in conducting research around legal issues pertaining to national security and with the Donald G. Costello College of Business' Center for Government Contracting. The school is also the psephology partner of The Washington Post, collaborating on electoral polling and analysis for the paper since 2016, the two hold an A+ rating for historical accuracy and methodology in polling from FiveThirtyEight.

The school also hosts the Taiwan Security Monitor, a student-driven open-source research initiative founded in 2021 by associate professor Michael Hunzeker. It publishes data, maps, and analysis on cross-strait security, including updates on Chinese military activity around Taiwan and U.S. arms sales to Taiwan.

== Relationship with the intelligence community ==
The school drew negative attention with the 2009 hiring of General Michael Hayden and Robert Deitz, both former high-ranking government officials, because of their role in mass surveillance including the NSA warrantless surveillance programs of 2001-2007 and other similar ethical criticisms. The Michael V. Hayden Center, a think tank founded in 2017, is associated with the Schar School.
