= Jürgen F. Strube =

German businessman

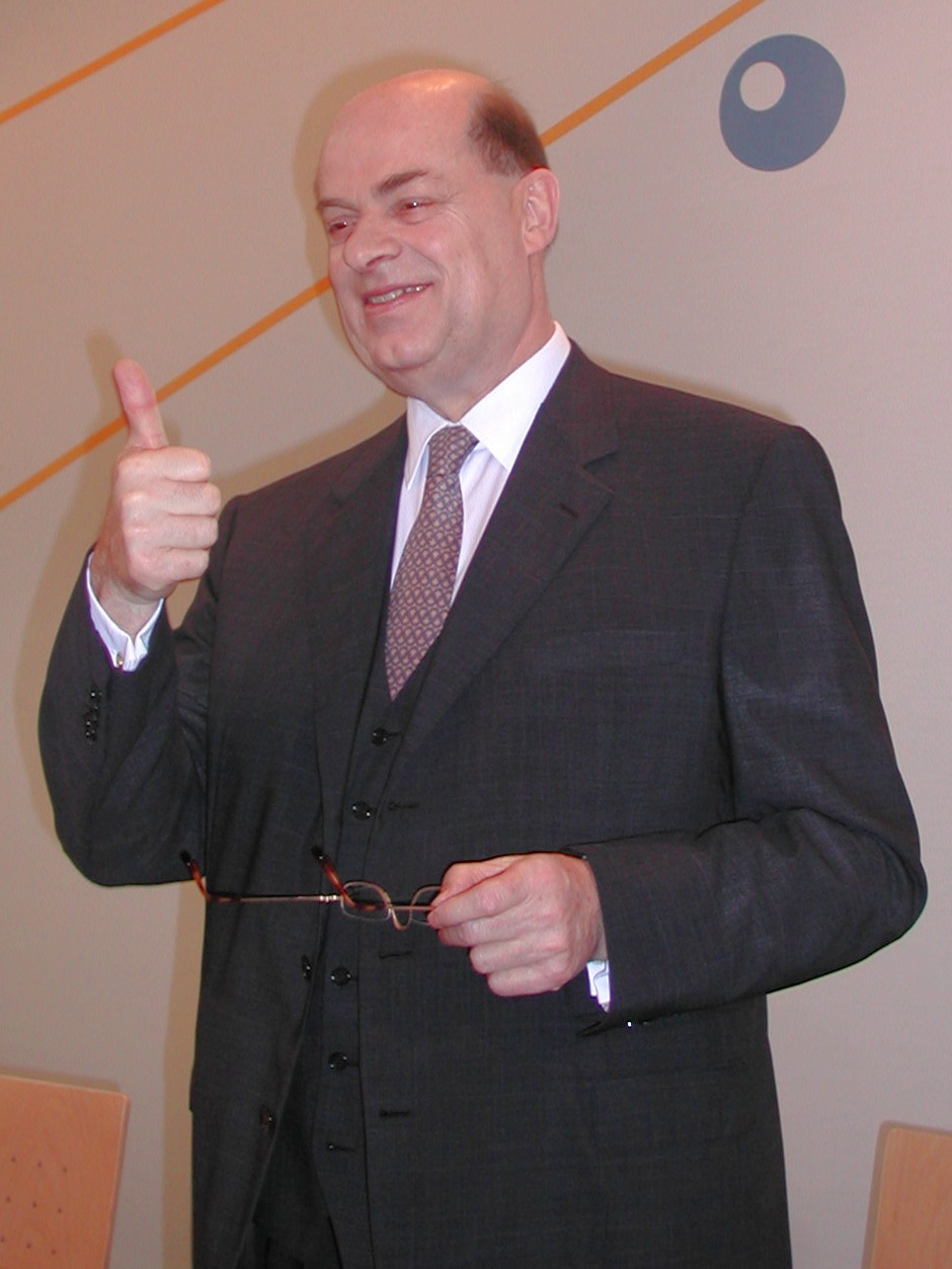
Image of Juergen Strube

Jürgen F. Strube (born 19 August 1939) is the former CEO and the current Chairman of the Supervisory Board of German chemical company BASF.

== Biography ==
Strube was born in Bochum in 1939. He studied law from 1960 to 1964 in Freiburg, Geneva and Munich, obtained his doctorate in law in Munich in 1967, and passed the second state examination in law in 1968. He began his professional career at BASF in 1969 in Germany, where he joined the Finance Department at Ludwigshafen. During his career he worked in several divisions in Antwerp, São Paulo, New Jersey and Germany. Since May 2003, he has been chairman of the Supervisory Board of BASF.

In 2003, he became the chair of UNICE, now the Confederation of European Business.

== Personal life ==
He is married with one daughter.
