= German Research Institute for Public Administration =

German research institute

Coordinates: 49°18′59.09″N 8°24′58.71″E

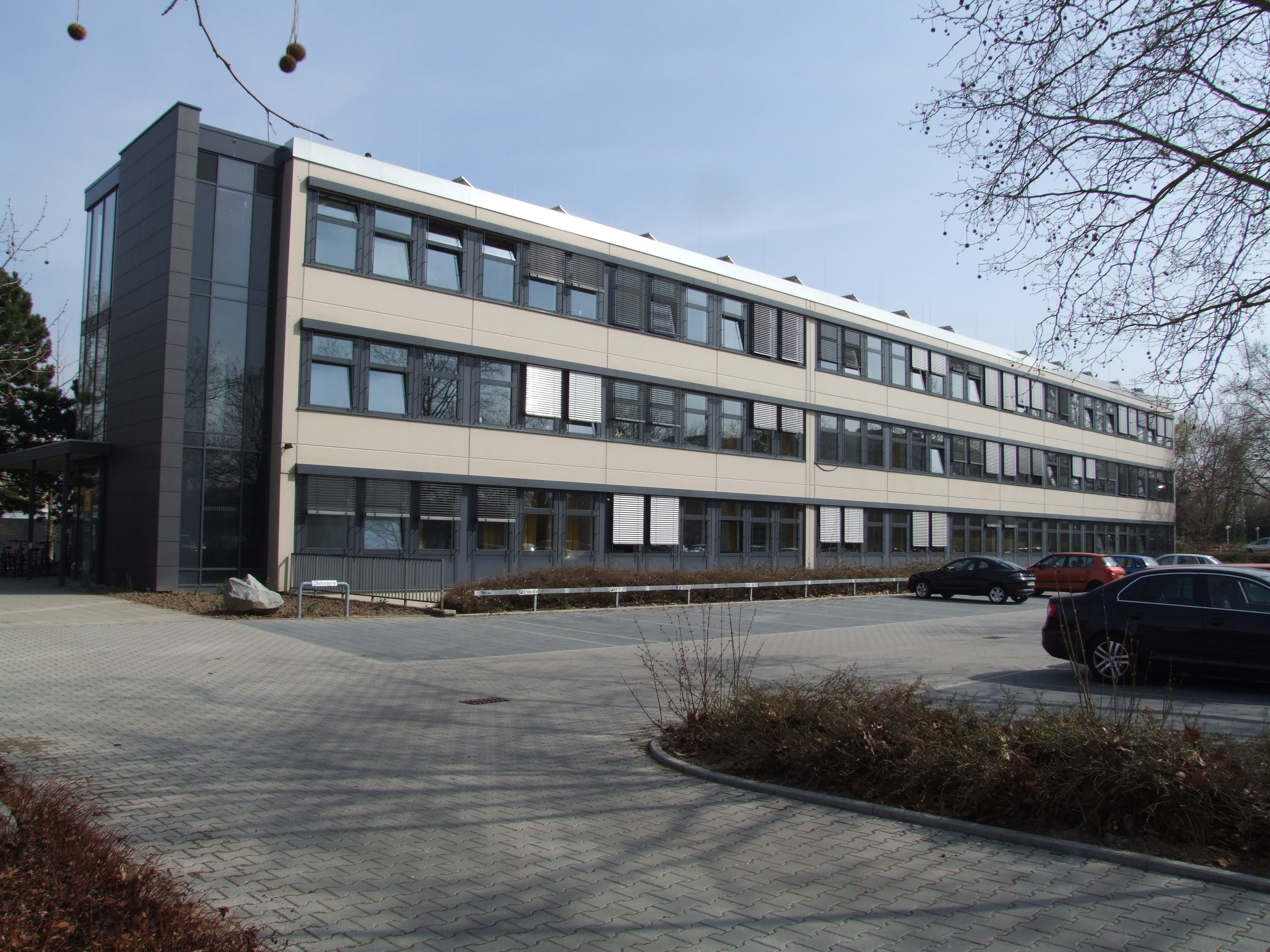
GRIP building at the DHV Speyer campus

The German Research Institute for Public Administration (GRIP, German: Deutsches Forschungsinstitut für öffentliche Verwaltung, FÖV) is a non-university research institute for public administration located in Speyer, Rhineland Palatinate, Germany. Founded in 1976 as an organizationally independent institution under the jurisdiction of the Minister-President of Rhineland-Palatinate, it is largely integrated in, and maintains a strategic partnership with the German University of Administrative Sciences Speyer. As an "institution of nationwide interest" it forms part of the Gottfried Wilhelm Leibniz Scientific Community and is thus funded equally by the Federal Republic and all 16 German states. At present the institute has 26 ordinary, 19 corresponding and two honorary fellows from Germany and abroad.

== See also ==
- German University of Administrative Sciences Speyer
- Gottfried Wilhelm Leibniz Scientific Community
