= Paul Cézanne University =

Public research university in Provence, France

Paul Cézanne University Aix-Marseille III
- Université Paul Cézanne; Aix-Marseille III
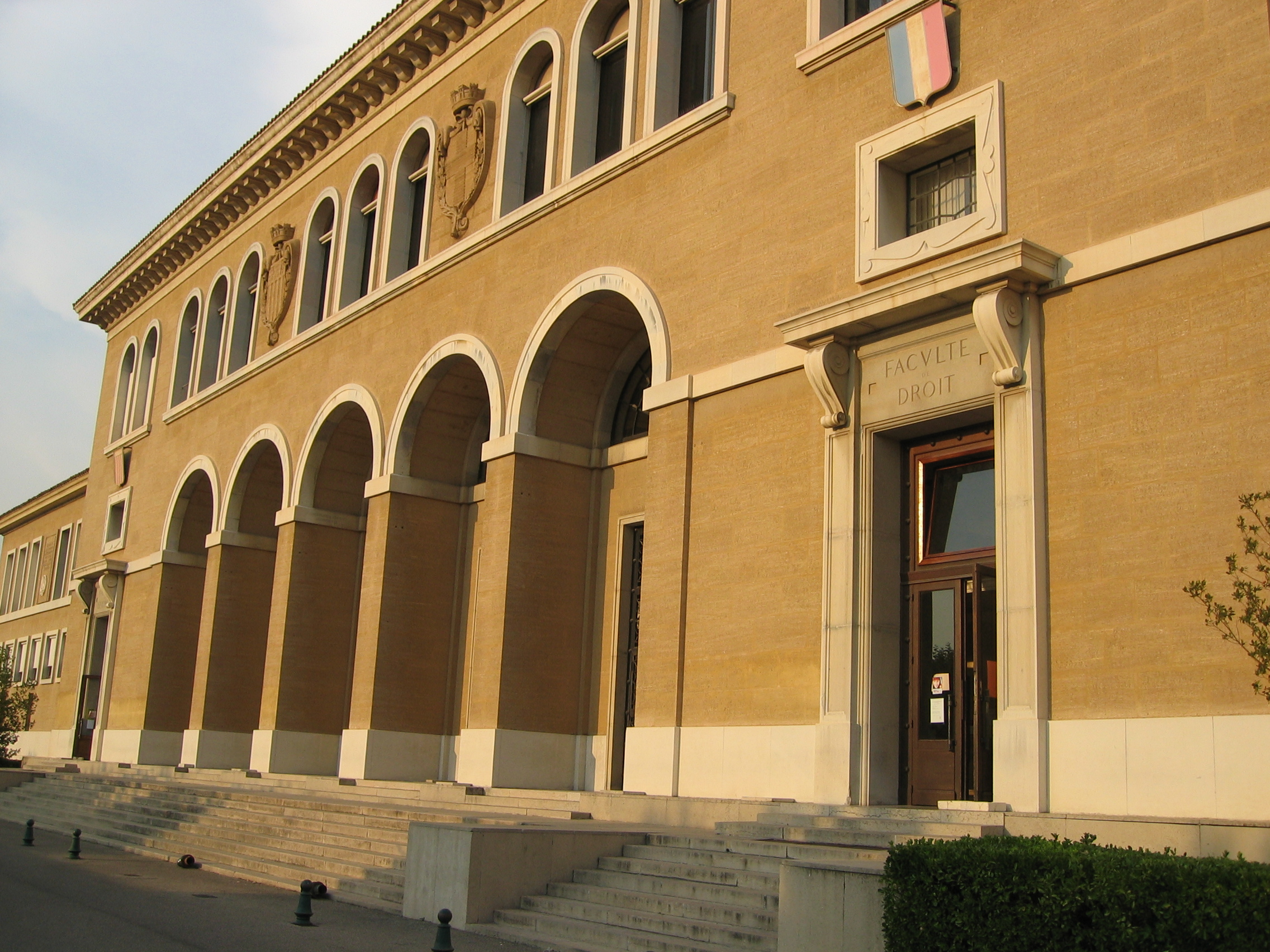
- Type: Public
- Active: 1973–2011
- Affiliations: Aix-Marseille University, Mediterranean Universities Union (UNIMED), Association of MBAs (AMBA), European University Association (EUA), European Quality Improvement System (EQUIS)
- Endowment: €100 million
- President: Marc Pena
- Faculty: 760
- Administrative staff: 930
- Students: 22,500
- Location: Aix-en-Provence and Marseille, France
- Website: www.univ-cezanne.fr (in French)

Paul Cézanne University (also referred to as Paul Cézanne University Aix-Marseille III; French: Université Paul Cézanne Aix-Marseille III; Occitan: Universitat Paulo Cézanne Ais-Marselha III) was a public research university based in the heart of Provence (southern France), in both Aix-en-Provence and Marseille. Opening in 1973, it was one of the three universities in the French region of Provence. Prior to merger, it was part of the Academy of Aix and Marseille, and its weight was considerable in the French university landscape. The university bore the name of Paul Cézanne, a prominent French artist and Post-Impressionist painter, who attended its law school from 1858 to 1861.

On 1 January 2012 it merged with the University of Provence and the University of the Mediterranean to become Aix-Marseille University, the youngest, but also the largest in terms of students, budgets and staff in France.

== Activity ==
The University of Aix-Marseille III had an established reputation as one of the oldest and most respected academic institutions in France. Many prominent government leaders have studied at the university's Institute of Political Studies (Institut d'études politiques d'Aix-en-Provence), which is now associated with Aix-Marseille University. Established in 1956, it is one of a network of 9 world-famous IEPs (Instituts d’Etudes Politiques) in France. The IEP is a Grande école in political science and its primary aim is to train senior executives for the public, semi-public, and private sectors. Although the IEP offers a multitude of disciplines, its main focus is on politics, including related subjects such as history, law, economics, languages, international relations, and media studies.

The law school at Paul Cézanne University, which is currently part of Aix-Marseille University, dates back to the university's foundation in 1409. The school had far-reaching influence, since written law, which in France originated in Aix-en-Provence, spread from there, eventually replacing the common law practiced throughout the rest of Northern Gaul. It is one of the largest law schools in France today, and is considered to be one of the nation's leading centres for legal research and teaching. The school is unique among French law schools for the breadth of courses offered and the extent of research undertaken in a wide range of fields. Other than Panthéon-Assas University, the school has attracted the most prestigious law faculty in France. The teaching faculty comprises 155 professors and 172 adjunct lecturers, the latter drawn from private practice, the civil service, the judiciary and other organizations. Much of the legal research at the university is done under the auspices of its many research institutes – there is one in almost every field of law. Research activity is buttressed by a network of libraries. The university library holds an impressive collection of monographs and periodicals, including an important collection of sixteenth century manuscripts. Moreover, the libraries have several specialized rooms dedicated to specific fields of law, in particular in International and European Law and Legal Theory.

The university's Institute of Business Administration (Institut d'Administration des Entreprises), commonly known as IAE Aix-en-Provence, now part of Aix-Marseille University, was the first Graduate School of Management in the French public university system. IAE Aix is "a prestigious, double-accredited institution, with an international approach to business combining both classic and innovative teaching methods", according to The Independent. The school offers graduate level programmes in general management, international management, internal audit of organisations, service management, internal and external communications management, management and information technologies, international financial management and applied marketing. In 2011, the MSc in General Management was ranked 2nd in France along with the MSc in Services Management and Marketing being ranked 3rd and the MSc in Audit and Corporate Governance also being ranked 3rd in the country by SMBG. In 1990, IAE Aix and the École supérieure des sciences économiques et commerciales (ESSEC) signed an agreement to unite and offer a joint Doctorate Programme, allowing ESSEC professors to teach in the Research Oriented Master programme in Aix-en-Provence. Furthermore, after Research Oriented Master graduation, students can attend the ESSEC Doctorate seminars and have an ESSEC Research Advisor (Directeur de Recherche). In the same way, ESSEC students can enroll in the IAE Aix's Research Oriented Master and Doctorate programmes. In both cases, the members of the thesis juries come from both IAE Aix and ESSEC. The Doctorate title is awarded by Aix-Marseille University.

The total budget volume of the university was equal to 44.93 m €. This amount did not include the civil servant salaries that were directly paid by the Trésor public. There were 1,329 civil servants including 678 faculty members. Their salaries roughly amounted to the initial budget figure to give a total budget of 100 m €. The university was split in 16 sites located in five cities. The overall area occupied by the university was equal to 225,000 square meters.

== Organization ==
There were eight major components in the University of Aix-Marseille III which benefited from financial autonomy:

- Faculty of Law and Political Science
  - Aix-en-Provence, Schuman
  - Aix-en-Provence, Poncet
  - Aix-en-Provence, Montperrin
  - Arles, Espace Van Gogh
  - Marseille, Space Canebière
- Faculty of Applied Economics
  - Aix-en-Provence, Schuman
  - Aix-en-Provence, Forbin
  - Marseille, Canebière
- Faculty of Science and Technology
  - Aix-en-Provence, Montperrin
  - Marseille, Saint-Jérôme
  - Marseille, Europôle of Arbois
- Institute of Business Administration – IAE Aix
  - Puyricard, Clos Guiot
- Institute of French Studies for Foreign Students
  - Aix-en-Provence, Cours Gambetta
- Institute of Public Management and Territorial Governance
  - Aix-en-Provence, Gaston de Saporta
  - Marseille, Liberation
- University Institute of Technology
  - Marseille, Saint-Jérôme
- Institute of Political Studies – Sciences Po Aix
  - Aix-en-Provence, Gaston de Saporta

== Notable alumni ==
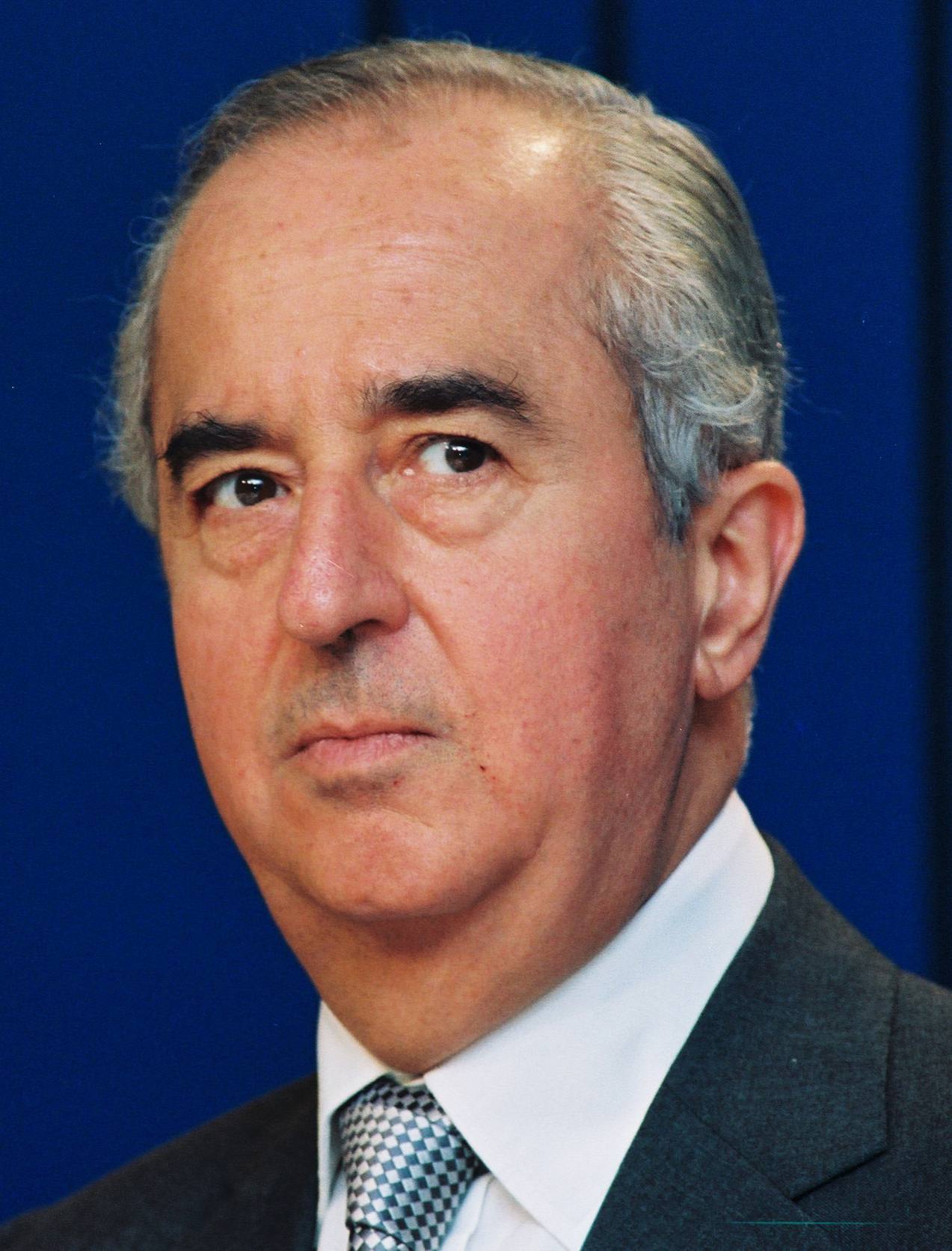
Édouard Balladur, Prime Minister of France from 1993 to 1995

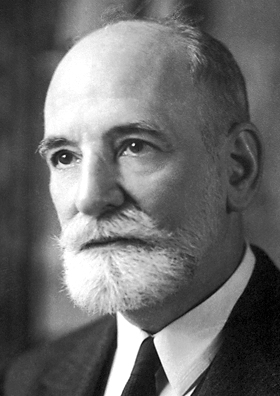
René Cassin, President of the European Court of Human Rights (ECtHR) from 1965 to 1968 & the Nobel Peace Prize Laureate

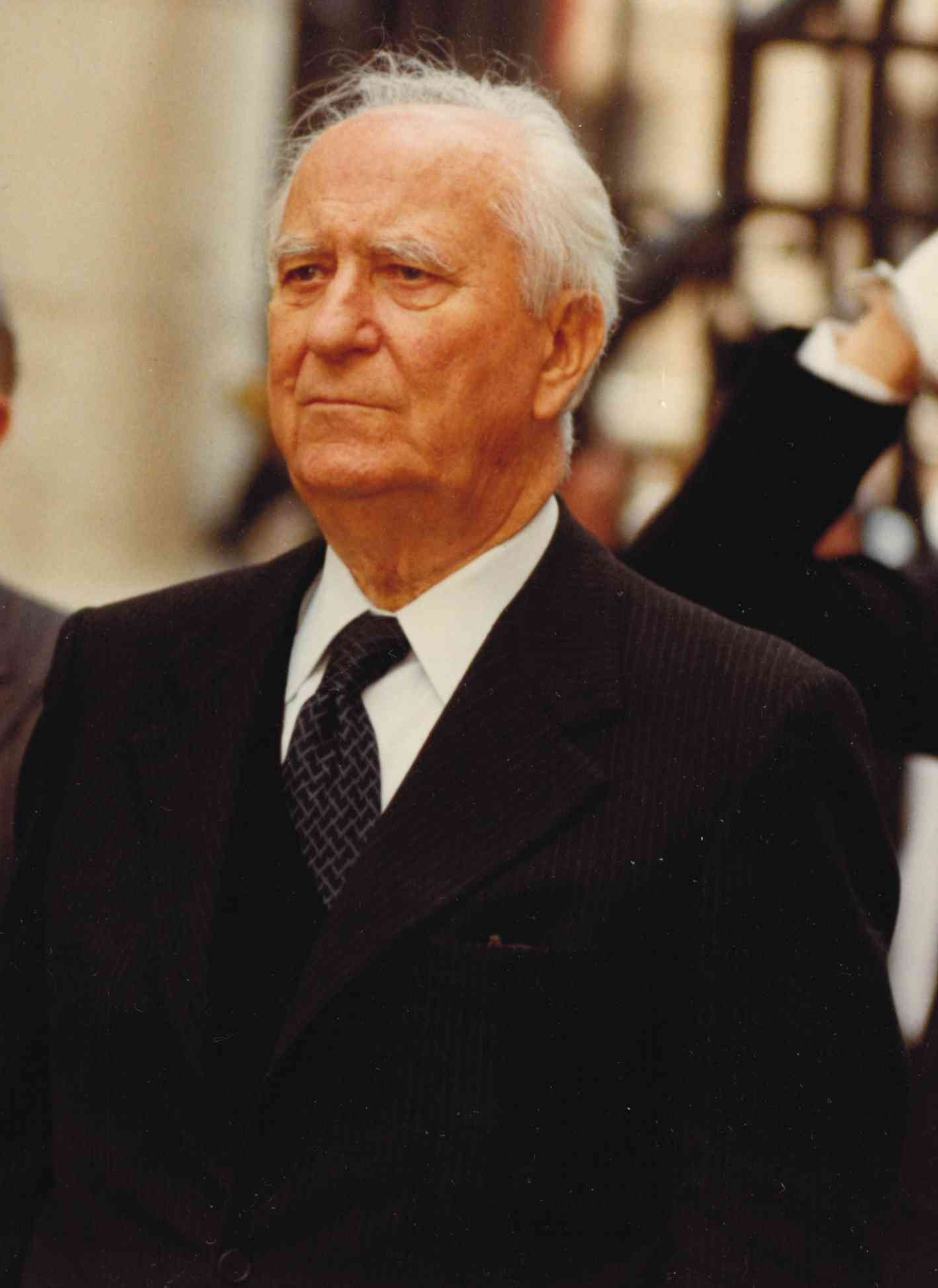
Gaston Defferre, Minister of the Interior of France from 1981 to 1984

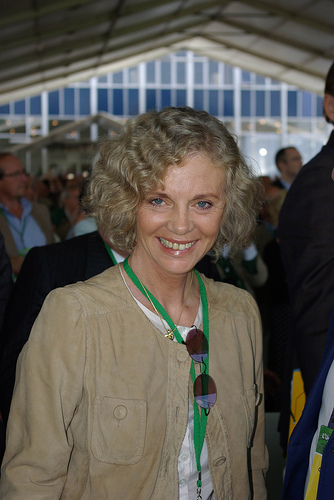
Élisabeth Guigou, Minister of Justice of France from 1997 to 2000

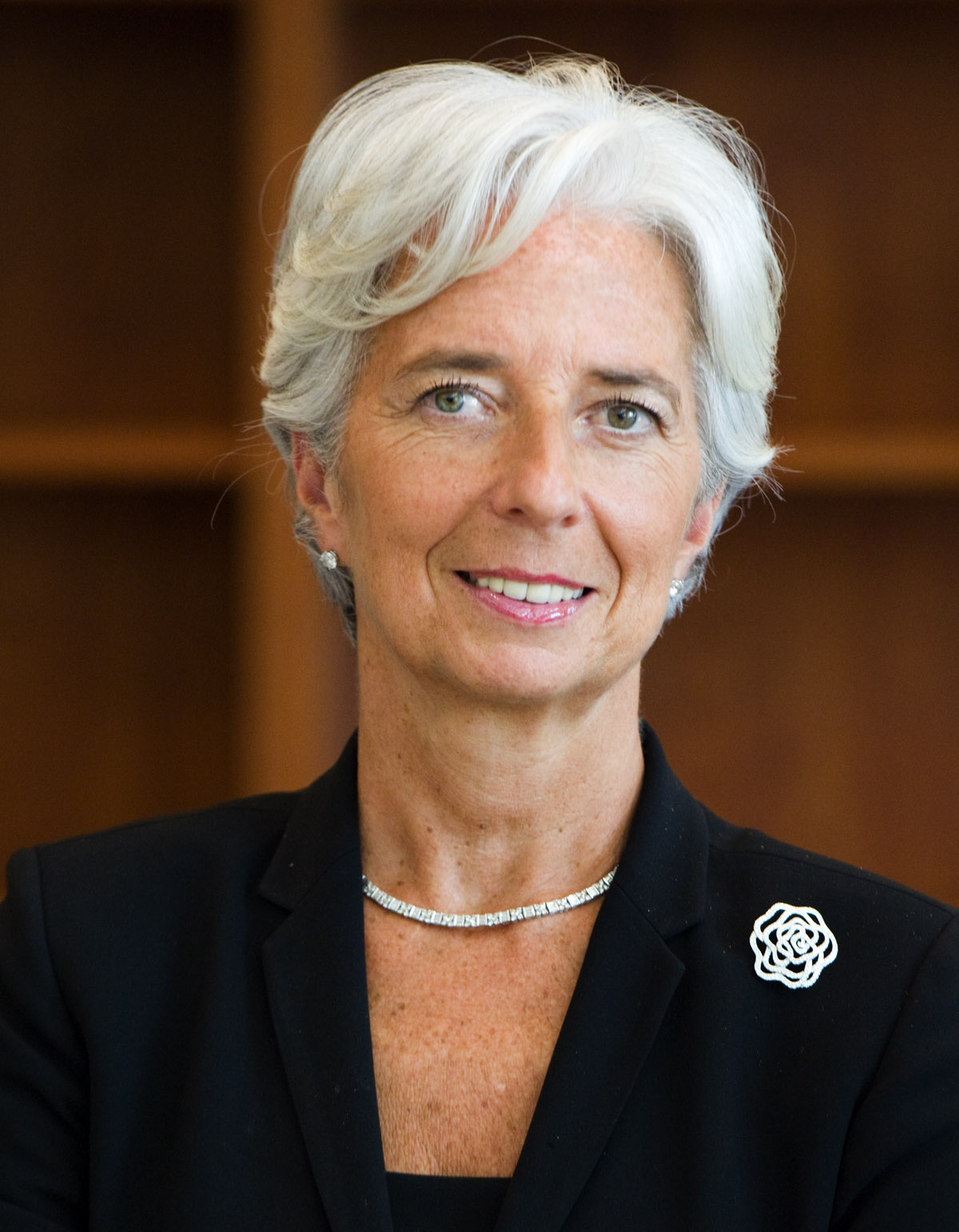
Christine Lagarde, Managing Director of the International Monetary Fund (IMF)

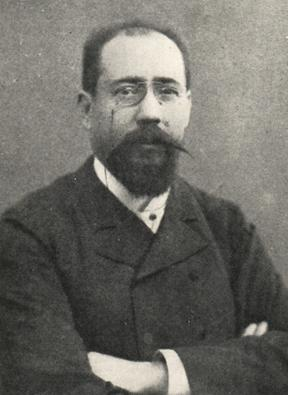
Maurice Rouvier, Prime Minister of France May-Dec 1887 & from 1905 to 1906

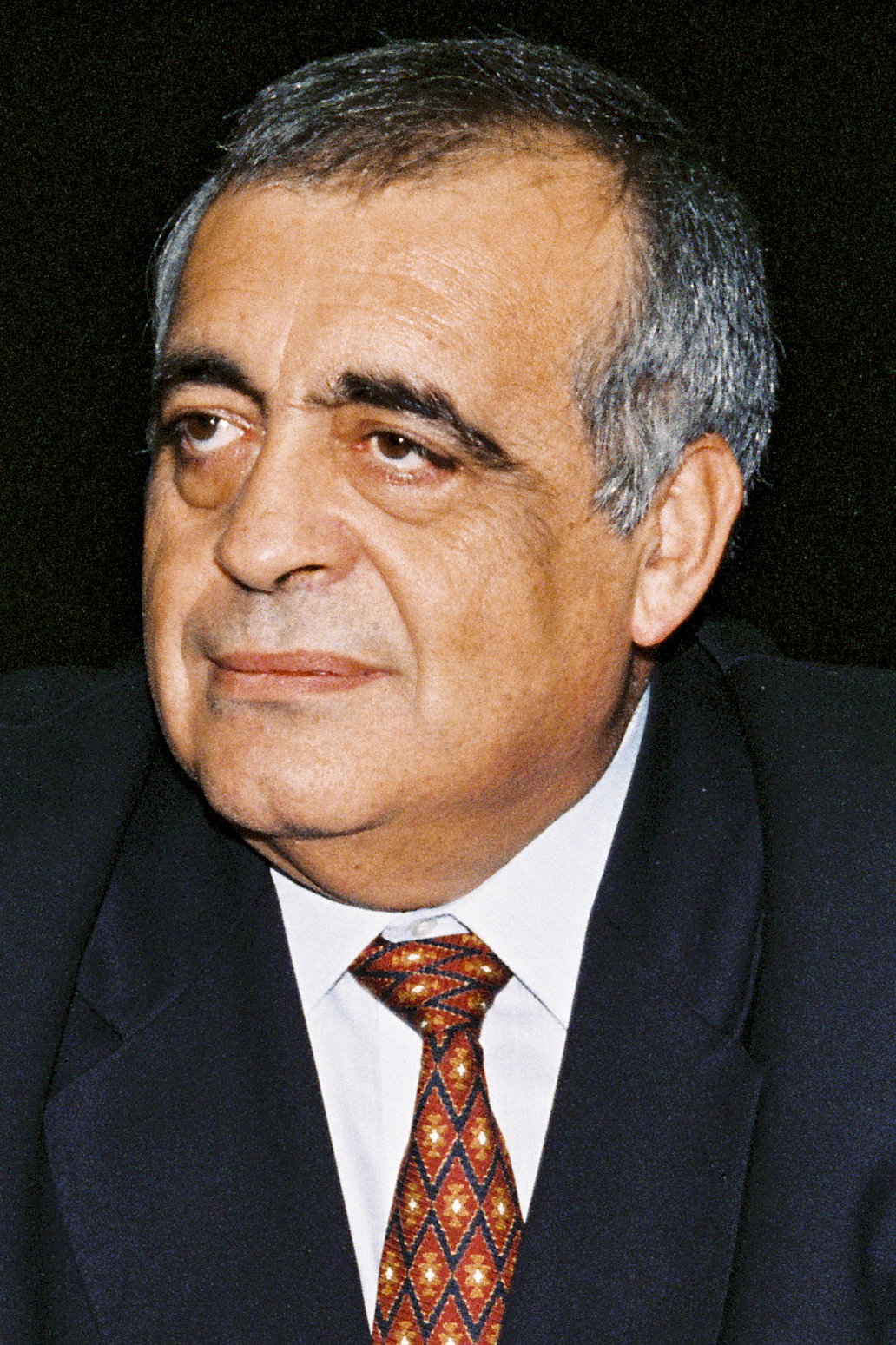
Philippe Séguin, President of the National Assembly of France from 1993 to 1997

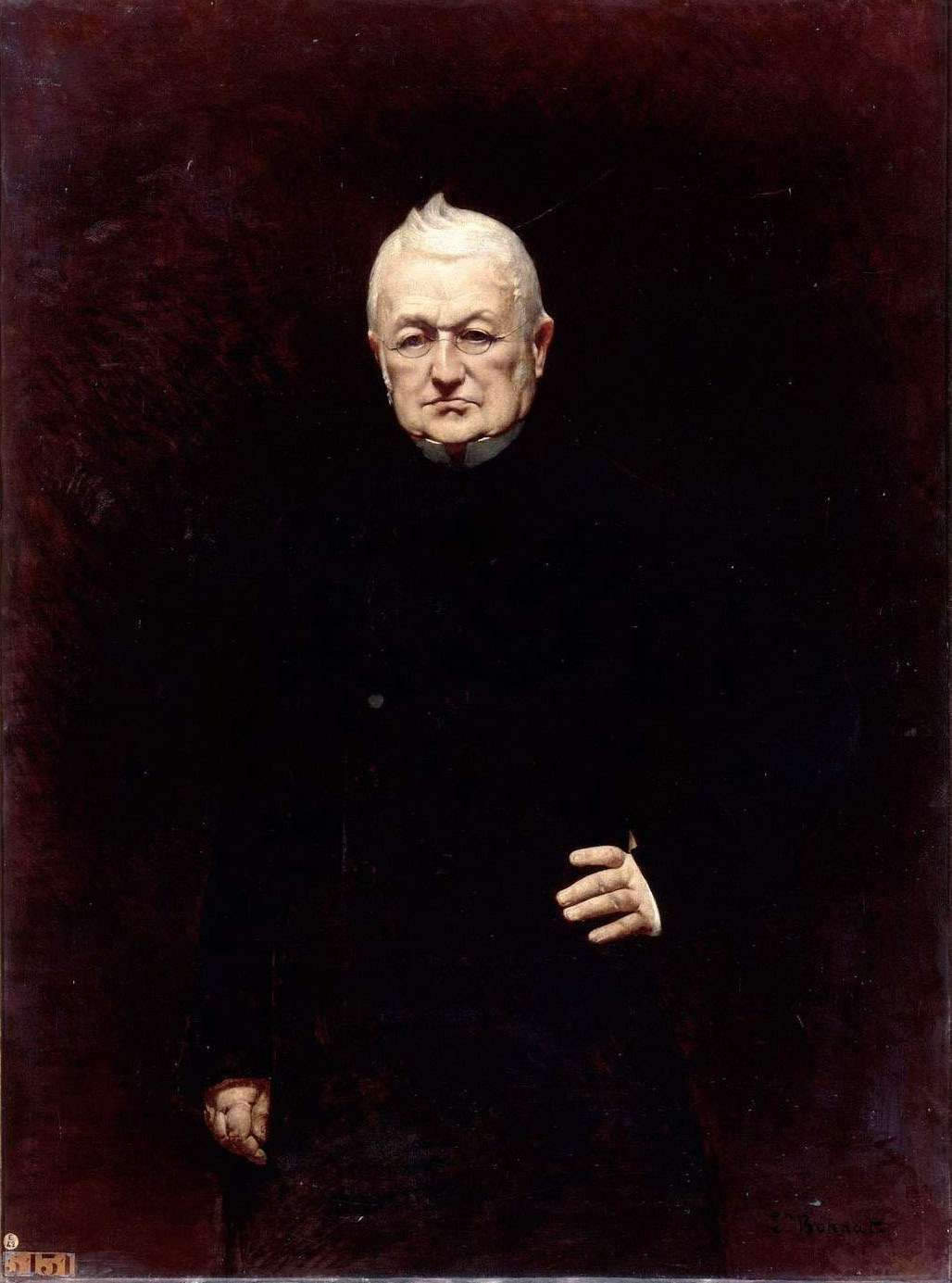
Adolphe Thiers, President of the French Republic from 1871 to 1873

- Jean Aicard – poet, dramatist and novelist
- Paul Alexis – novelist, dramatist and journalist
- Joseph d'Arbaud – poet
- Fanny Ardant – actress, winner of the César Award for Best Actress
- Isabelle Arvers – media art curator, critic and author, specializing in video and computer games, web animation, digital cinema, retrogaming, chip tunes and machinima
- Ali Bach Hamba – Tunisian lawyer, journalist and politician
- Édouard Balladur – Prime Minister of France: 1993–1995; Minister of the Economy, Finance and Privatization of France: 1986–1988
- Charles Jean Marie Barbaroux – politician of the Revolutionary period
- Victor Barthélemy – political activist
- Dominique Bénard – former Deputy Secretary-General of the World Organization of the Scout Movement (WOSM)
- Léon de Berluc-Pérussis – poet and historian
- Roland Blum – conservative politician, member of the National Assembly of France and member of the Union for a Popular Movement (UMP)
- Philippe Bourguignon – Member of the Board of Directors of eBay, former co-Chief Executive Officer of the World Economic Forum (WEF)
- Valérie Boyer – Member of the National Assembly of France
- Marcel Brion – essayist, literary critic, novelist and historian
- Emmanuel Brunet Jailly – Canadian politics and public policy scholar
- Marie-Arlette Carlotti – Member of the European Parliament
- René Cassin – the French Minister of Justice: 1941–1943; President of the European Court of Human Rights (ECtHR): 1965–1968; the 1968 Nobel Peace Prize Laureate
- Paul Cézanne – artist and Post-Impressionist painter
- Zouheir Chokr – President of the Lebanese University, former Lebanese Ambassador to Qatar
- Jürgen Chrobog – German Ambassador to the United States: 1995–2001
- Raphaël Confiant –writer
- Adolphe Crémieux – French Minister of Justice: 1848; 1870–1871
- Gaston Crémieux – lawyer, journalist and writer
- Gaston Defferre – Minister of the Interior of France: 1981–1984; Mayor of Marseille: 1944–1946; 1953–1986
- Thomas Degos – Prefect of Mayotte: 2011–present
- Alexandre del Valle – Italo-French political scientist and geopolitician
- Blaise Diagne – political leader, the first black African elected to the National Assembly of France
- Pape Diouf – President of Olympique de Marseille: 2005–2009
- Émile Eddé – President of Lebanon: 1936–1941; 1943; Prime Minister of Lebanon: 1929–1930
- Toussaint-Bernard Émeric-David – archaeologist and writer on art
- Roland Eng – Advisor to the Cambodian Government and Ambassador-at-Large
- Bruno Étienne – sociologist and political analyst
- Roger Excoffon – graphic designer
- Charles Annibal Fabrot – jurisconsult
- Pierre Falcone – businessman, the Chairman of Pierson Capital Group
- Christopher Fomunyoh – Senior Associate for Africa and Regional Director at the National Democratic Institute for International Affairs (NDI)
- José Frèches – historical novelist
- Thomas Galbraith, 2nd Baron Strathclyde, PC – British politician, the Leader of the House of Lords, the Chancellor of the Duchy of Lancaster, and the Leader of the Conservative Party in the House of Lords
- Romain Gary – diplomat, novelist, film director and World War II aviator
- Antoine Marc Gaudin – professor at the Massachusetts Institute of Technology (MIT), and a founding member of the National Academy of Engineering (NAE)
- Jean-Pierre Gibert – Canon lawyer
- Félix Gouin – President of the Provisional Government of the French Republic: 1946; Co-Prince of Andorra: 1946; President of the Constituent National Assembly of France: 1945–1946
- Sylvie Goulard – Member of the European Parliament
- Élisabeth Guigou – French Minister of Justice: 1997–2000; the French Minister of Social Affairs: 2000–2002
- Malek Haddad – anAlgerian poet and writer
- Peter Hambro – founder of Peter Hambro Mining and a Non-Executive Director of the Private Banking Division of Société Générale
- Maryse Joissains-Masini – Member of the National Assembly of France; Mayor of Aix-en-Provence: 2001–present
- Sophie Joissains – politician and a member of the Senate of France
- Pravind Jugnauth – Vice Prime Minister of Mauritius: 2010–2011; Minister of Finance of Mauritius: 2003–2005; 2009–2011
- Sébastien Jumel – politician, member of the French Communist Party (PCF)
- Roger Karoutchi – Ambassador to the Organisation for Economic Co-operation and Development (OECD): 2009–present
- Vasil Kolarov – Provisional President of Bulgaria: 1946–1947; Prime Minister of Bulgaria: 1949–1950
- Mamadou Koulibaly – President of the National Assembly of Côte d'Ivoire: 2001–present
- Christine Lagarde – Managing Director of the International Monetary Fund (IMF): 2011–present; Minister of the Economy, Industry and Employment of France: 2007–2011
- Luzolo Bambi Lessa - Minister of Justice of the Democratic Republic of the Congo: 2008–present
- Raphaël Liogier – Director of the Observatoire du religieux
- Jean-Charles Marchiani – prefect and politician
- Jean-François Mattéi – philosopher
- Kenneth H. Merten – American diplomat and the current United States Ambassador to Haiti
- Paul Meurisse – actor
- François Mignet –journalist and historian
- Stoyan Mihaylovski – Bulgarian writer and social figure
- Honoré Gabriel Riqueti, comte de Mirabeau – President of the National Constituent Assembly of France: 1791
- Frédéric Mistral – writer, winner of the 1904 Nobel Prize in Literature
- Iulia Motoc – Judge at the European Court of Human Rights, former Member of the United Nations Human Rights Committee, former judge of the Constitutional Court of Romania
- Prince Norodom Ranariddh – second son of former king Norodom Sihanouk of Cambodia and a half-brother of the current king Norodom Sihamoni
- Patrick Ollier – President of the National Assembly of France: 2007; Vice-President of the National Assembly of France: 1998–2002
- Joseph Louis Elzéar Ortolan – jurist and former Chair of Comparative Criminal Law at the Sorbonne University
- Philip M. Parker – INSEAD Chaired Professor of Management Science
- Benoît Pelletier – Minister of Canadian Intergovernmental Affairs: 2003–2008; Leader of the Government in Parliament: 2007–2008
- Terry Phillips – journalist, author and media consultant
- Richard Pollock – Canadian lawyer and politician
- Jean-Étienne-Marie Portalis – jurist and politician in time of the French Revolution and the First Empire
- François Juste Marie Raynouard – dramatist and academic
- André de Richaud – poet and writer
- Didier Robert – Member of the National Assembly of France
- Maurice Rouvier – Prime Minister of France: 1887; 1905–1906; Minister of Foreign Affairs of France: 1905–1906
- Ambroise Roux-Alphéran – historian
- Nicolas Schmit – Minister of Labour, Employment and Immigration of Luxembourg: 2009–present
- Philippe Séguin – President of the National Assembly of France: 1993–1997; President of the Court of Financial Auditors of France: 2004–2010
- Roland Theis – General Secretary of the Christian Democrat Union in Saarland, Germany
- Adolphe Thiers – 2nd President of France: 1871–1873; Co-Prince of Andorra: 1871–1873; Minister of the Interior of France: Oct–Dec 1832; Apr–Nov 1834; 1834–1836; Minister of Foreign Affairs of France: Feb–Sep 1836; Mar–Oct 1840; Prime Minister of France: Feb–Sep 1836; Mar–Oct 1840
- Dominique Tian – Member of the National Assembly of France
- Jean-Louis Trintignant – actor, winner of the Best Actor Award at the Cannes Film Festival
- Richard Tuheiava – Member of the Senate of France
- Colin Tyre, Lord Tyre CBE – Scottish lawyer, former President of the Council of Bars and Law Societies of Europe, and a Senator of the College of Justice, a judge of the Supreme Courts of Scotland
- Albert Jan van den Berg – Arbitration Chair at Erasmus University Rotterdam and the President of the Netherlands Arbitration Institute
- Fernando José de França Dias Van-Dúnem – Prime Minister of Angola: 1991–1992; 1996–1999; President of the National Assembly of Angola: 1992–1996
- Nicolas Vatomanga – saxophonist, flutist, bandleader and composer
- Jens Weidmann – 8th President of the Deutsche Bundesbank: 2011–present; Member of the Governing Council of the European Central Bank (ECB): 2011–present; Governor of the International Monetary Fund (IMF): 2011–present
- Claire Atangana Bikouna – Cameroonian lawyer

== Notable faculty ==
- Sami A. Aldeeb – Head of the Arab and Islamic Law Department at the Swiss Institute of Comparative Law, and Director of the Center of Arab and Islamic Law
- Renato Balduzzi – Minister of Health of Italy: 2011–present
- Boudewijn Bouckaert – Belgian law professor, a member of the Flemish Movement, and a libertarian conservative thinker and politician
- Sadok Chaabane – Minister of Justice of Tunisia: 1992–1997; Minister of Higher Education and Scientific Research of Tunisia: 1999–2004
- Barry E. Friedman – American academic with an expertise in federal courts, working at the intersections of law, politics and history
- Bernard Harcourt – Chair of the Political Science Department, professor of political science and the Julius Kreeger Professor of Law at the University of Chicago
- Ayşe Işıl Karakaş – Turkish academic, judge of the European Court of Human Rights (ECtHR)
- Jean-Louis Le Moigne – specialist on systems theory and constructivist epistemology
- Leonard Liggio –classical liberal author, research professor of law at George Mason University, and executive vice president of the Atlas Economic Research Foundation in Fairfax, Virginia
- John Loughlin – Director of the Von Hügel Institute, and a Senior Fellow and Affiliated Lecturer in the Department of Politics and International Studies at the University of Cambridge
- Ejan Mackaay – Professor of Law at the Université de Montréal
- Joseph Jérôme, Comte Siméon – Minister of the Interior of France: 1820–1821; President of the Court of Financial Auditors of France: 1837–1839
- Ronald Sokol – American lawyer and writer
- William H. Starbuck – organizational scientist who held professorships in social relations (Johns Hopkins University), sociology (Cornell University), business administration (University of Wisconsin–Milwaukee), and management (New York University)
- Rafał Taubenschlag – Polish historian of law, a specialist in Roman law and papyrology
- Michael Tigar – an American criminal defense attorney
- Michel van den Abeele – former Director-General of the European Commission
- Philippe Van Parijs – Belgian philosopher and political economist
- John Waterbury – American academic, professor of politics and international affairs at Princeton University's Woodrow Wilson School of Public and International Affairs

== Presidents ==
- 1973–1977: Charles Debbasch
- 1977–1982: Louis Favoreu
- 1982–1994: Lucien Capella
- 1994–1999: Christian Louit
- 1999–2000: Gilbert Peiffer
- 2000–2005: Jacques Bourdon
- 2005–2008: Philippe Tchamitchian
- 2008–2011: Marc Pena
