= Denis Robin (civil servant) =

French civil servant

Prefect of Mayotte
- In office 12 September 2008 – 13 July 2009
- Preceded by: Vincent Bouvier
- Succeeded by: Christophe Peyrel (acting); Hubert Derache

Denis Robin (born 15 December 1962) is a French civil servant. Robin served as the Prefect of Mayotte from 12 September 2008 to 13 July 2009. He left this position to become the chief of staff for the Minister of Overseas France, Marie-Luce Penchard. He was succeeded as Prefect by Hubert Derache.
