= Patrick Duprat =

French official

Patrick Duprat is a Mayotte politician. Formerly a sub-prefect of the French commune of Yssingeaux, Duprat was appointed Secretary-General of the Prefecture of Mayotte on 10 May 2010. He then served as acting prefect between 4 July and 21 July 2011, from the end of Hubert Derache's tenure to the appointment of Thomas Degos.
