= Marie-Arlette Carlotti =

French politician (born 1952)

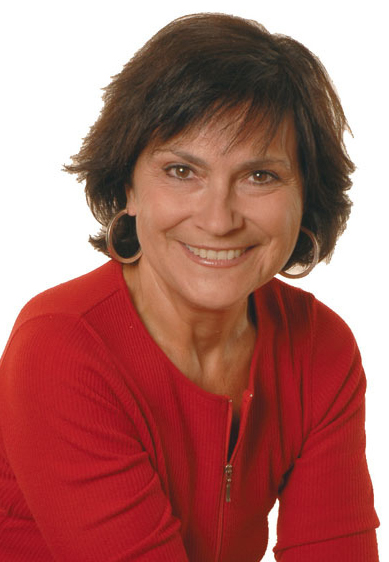
- Marie-Arlette Carlotti in 2012

Member of the French Senate for Bouches-du-Rhône
- Incumbent
- Assumed office 1 October 2020

Minister Delegate to Disabled people
- In office 16 May 2012 – 31 March 2014
- President: François Hollande
- Prime Minister: Jean-Marc Ayrault
- Succeeded by: Ségolène Neuville

Member of the National Assembly for Bouches-du-Rhône's 5th constituency
- In office 20 June 2012 – 20 June 2017
- Preceded by: Renaud Muselier
- Succeeded by: Cathy Racon-Bouzon

Personal details
- Born: 21 January 1952 (age 74) Béziers, France
- Party: Socialist Party
- Education: Paul Cézanne University; IAE Aix-en-Provence

Marie-Arlette Carlotti (French pronunciation: [maʁi aʁlɛt kaʁlɔti]; born 21 January 1952 in Béziers) is a French politician of the Socialist Party (PS) who has been serving as a member of the French Senate since 2020, representing Bouches-du-Rhône. She previously was a Member of the European Parliament from south-east of France.

== Early life and education ==
- Specialised postgraduate diploma in law (1979)
- Specialised postgraduate diploma in human resource management (1986)

Educated at Paul Cézanne University in Marseille, France

== Early career ==
- Company executive in the aeronautical industry (since 1991)

== Political career ==
=== Early beginnings ===
- Member of the Socialist Party national executive and national secretary (1986–1994)
- national delegate (since 1998)
- Member of the Bouches-du-Rhône Departmental Council representing the Canton of Marseille-Les Cinq-Avenues(since 1988)

=== Member of the European Parliament, 1996–2009 ===
As member of the Party of European Socialists, Carlotti served on the European Parliament's Committee on Development. In this capacity, she served as the parliament's rapporteur on the role of migration for development in 2006. She was a substitute for the Committee on Foreign Affairs.

In addition to her committee assignments, Carlotti was a vice-chair of the ACP–EU Joint Parliamentary Assembly and a member of the delegations for relations with the Maghreb countries and the Arab Maghreb Union, and to the Euro-Mediterranean Parliamentary Assembly.

Carlotti was one of six Members of the European Parliament participating in the European Union's observer mission in Togo for the October 2007 Togolese parliamentary election.

=== Career in government ===
On 16 May 2012 Carlotti was appointed by President François Hollande as Junior Minister for the Disabled at the Ministry of Social Affairs and Health, in the government of Prime Minister Jean-Marc Ayrault.

=== Member of the French Parliament, 2012–2017 ===
- Deputy for Bouches-du-Rhône's 5th constituency in the National Assembly

Ahead of the 2014 French municipal elections, Carlotti announced her intention to become the Socialist Party's candidate to challenge incumbent Mayor of Marseille Jean-Claude Gaudin; however, she lost her party's primaries against Patrick Mennucci and Samia Ghali.

In the Socialist Party's 2018 convention in Aubervilliers, Carlotti publicly endorsed Stéphane Le Foll as candidate for the party's leadership.

=== Member of the French Senate, 2020–present ===
In the Senate, Carlotti serves on the Committee on Foreign Affairs and Defense.

In 2025, Marie-Arlette Carlotti wrote a report on the state of relations between Africa and France. In this report entitled "Seeing Africa in all its States". They also made 20 proposals for the future and invited the French government in particular to demonstrate "strategic patience" in the Sahel.
