= Bouches-du-Rhône's 5th constituency =

Constituency of the National Assembly of France

5th constituency of Bouches-du-Rhône
- inline Constituency of the National Assembly of France

- Constituency in Bouches-du-Rhône Department (white area is the Étang de Berre lagoon)

- Bouches-du-Rhône in France
- Deputy: Hendrik Davi; DVG
- Department: Bouches-du-Rhône

The 5th constituency of Bouches-du-Rhône is a French legislative constituency in Bouches-du-Rhône.

== Deputies ==
Election	Member	Party
2007	Renaud Muselier	UMP
2012	Marie-Arlette Carlotti	PS
2017	Cathy Racon-Bouzon	LREM
2022	Hendrik Davi	LFI
2024	Hendrik Davi	DVG

== Elections ==
=== 2024 ===
Candidate	Party	Alliance	First round			Second round		
Candidate	Party	Alliance	Votes	%	+/–	Votes	%	+/–
Franck Liquori	RN		12,938	25.77	+10.45	15,638	34.05	new
Hendrik Davi	DVG		12,271	24.44	new	30,287	65.95	new
Allan Popelard	LFI	NFP	11,706	23.32	-16.98	withdrew		
Maxime Boudet	RE	Ensemble	8,985	17.90	-5.51			
Ambroise Malinconi	LR	UDC	2,576	5.13	+1.11			
Barthélémy Plez	DIV		865	1.72	new			
Marcel Blanc	REC		598	1.19	-5.26			
Nathalie Malhole	LO		264	0.53	-0.15			
Pierre-Frédéric Zieba	DIV		3	0.01	new			
Pauline Papazian	REG		0	0.00	new			
Votes			50,206	100.00		45,925	100.00	
Valid votes			50,206	98.49	+0.09	45,925	93.53	+0.19
Blank votes			472	0.93	-0.21	2,543	5.18	+0.33
Null votes			297	0.58	+0.12	634	1.29	-0.52
Turnout			50,975	67.55	+21.31	49,102	65.04	+20.60
Abstentions			24,486	32.45	-21.31	26,389	34.98	-20.60
Registered voters			75,461			75,491		
Result			DVG GAIN FROM LFI					

Hendrik Davi was elected as an LFI candidate at the prior election, and decided to run as a dissident of this party in this election without the endorsement of the NFP. Changes for LFI are compared to LFI results in 2022, and Davi is listed as being a new candidate.

=== 2022 ===
Legislative Election 2022: Bouches-du-Rhône's 5th constituency
Party	Candidate	Votes	%	±%
LFI (NUPÉS)	Hendrik Davi	13,496	40.30	+15.51
LREM (Ensemble)	Cathy Racon-Bouzon	7,841	23.41	-5.59
RN	Sandrine Lambert	5,131	15.32	+0.96
REC	Marine Manivet	2,159	6.45	N/A
LR (UDC)	Maryline Antoine	1,346	4.02	−14.83
DVE	Quentin Vincetti	758	2.26	N/A
Others	N/A	2,760		
Turnout		34,035	46.24	−2.62
2nd round result
LFI (NUPÉS)	Hendrik Davi	17,295	56.64	+8.85
LREM (Ensemble)	Cathy Racon-Bouzon	13,240	43.36	−8.85
Turnout		30,535	44.44	+5.49
LFI gain from LREM				

=== 2017 ===
Candidate	Label	First round		Second round	
Candidate	Label	Votes	%	Votes	%
Cathy Racon-Bouzon	REM	9,621	29.00	12,725	52.21
Hendrik Davi	FI	6,296	18.98	11,648	47.79
Yves Moraine	LR	6,253	18.85		
Jean-François Luc	FN	4,764	14.36		
Isabelle Pasquet	PCF	1,035	3.12		
Christophe Madrolle	ECO	892	2.69		
Daniel Vanetti	ECO	833	2.51		
Maurice Di Nocera	DVD	794	2.39		
Yves Castanet	ECO	556	1.68		
Sébastien Desille	PRG	447	1.35		
Patrick Thevenin	DVD	431	1.30		
Mathilde Gouin	DLF	366	1.10		
Nathalie Malhole	EXG	159	0.48		
Sophie Gaspar	DIV	157	0.47		
Ahmed Azouaou	ECO	156	0.47		
Akim Mimoun	DVG	143	0.43		
Corinne Raynaud	EXG	67	0.20		
Philippe Mourot	DVD	56	0.17		
Anne Tomasi	REG	56	0.17		
Grégory Slama	DIV	55	0.17		
Victoire Bourgeat	DIV	32	0.10		
Jean-Claude Bélenguier	DVD	3	0.01		
Pierre-Frédéric Zieba	DIV	0	0.00		
Votes		33,172	100.00	24,373	100.00
Valid votes		33,172	98.30	24,373	90.61
Blank votes		467	1.38	1,889	7.02
Null votes		106	0.31	638	2.37
Turnout		33,745	48.86	26,900	38.95
Abstentions		35,317	51.14	42,155	61.05
Registered voters		69,062		69,055	
Source: Ministry of the Interior

=== 2012 ===
Summary of the 10 June and 17 June 2012 French legislative election in Bouches-du-Rhône’s 5th Constituency
Candidate	Party		1st round		2nd round	
Candidate	Party		Votes	%	Votes	%
Marie-Arlette Carlotti	Socialist Party	PS	13,785	34.43%	20,212	51.81%
Renaud Muselier	Union for a Popular Movement	UMP	12,991	32.45%	18,799	48.19%
Jean Pierre Baumann	Front National	FN	6,512	16.27%		
Frédéric Dutoit	Left Front	FG	3,040	7.59%		
Michèle Rubirola-Blanc	Europe Ecology – The Greens	EELV	1,368	3.42%		
Hélène Coulomb		CEN	657	1.64%		
Chantal Sebag	Other	AUT	394	0.98%		
Mylène Gugliotta	Ecologist	ECO	222	0.55%		
François Franceschi	Miscellaneous Right	DVD	204	0.51%		
Hubert Fayard	Miscellaneous Right	DVD	188	0.47%		
Ahmed Azouaou	Ecologist	ECO	144	0.36%		
Michèle Alphonse	Miscellaneous Right	DVD	139	0.35%		
Richard Bonacase	Far Right	EXD	133	0.33%		
Junie Ciccione	Far Left	EXG	131	0.33%		
Corinne Raynaud	Far Left	EXG	67	0.17%		
Nathalie Malhole	Far Left	EXG	57	0.14%		
Frédéric Boeuf-Salor	Ecologist	ECO	0	0.00%		
Total			40,032	100%	39,011	100%
Registered voters			68,685		68,665	
Blank/Void ballots			380	0.94%	1,215	3.02%
Turnout			40,412	58.84%	40,226	58.58%
Abstentions			28,273	41.16%	28,439	41.42%
Result					PS GAIN	

=== 2007 ===
Summary of the 10 June and 17 June 2007 French legislative election in Bouches-du-Rhône’s 5th Constituency
Candidate	Party		1st round		2nd round	
Candidate	Party		Votes	%	Votes	%
Renaud Muselier	Union for a Popular Movement	UMP	13,999	45.70%	15,098	53.32%
Antoine Rouzaud	Radical Party of the Left	PRG	7,083	23.12%	13,220	46.68%
Christophe Madrolle	Democratic Movement	MoDem	2,222	7.25%		
Gilda Mih	Front National	FN	2,000	6.53%		
Jean-Marc Coppola	Communist	PCF	1,619	5.28%		
Sébastien Fournier	Far Left	EXG	1,315	4.29%		
Michèle Rubirola Blanc	The Greens	VEC	1,001	3.27%		
Jean Frizzi	Ecologist	ECO	472	1.54%		
Odile Grenet	Movement for France	MPF	245	0.80%		
Nathalie Malhole	Far Left	EXG	236	0.77%		
Sophie Aime Blanc	Far Right	EXD	179	0.58%		
Joël Boeuf	Independent	DIV	153	0.50%		
Chantal Pinero	Miscellaneous Right	DVD	111	0.36%		
Arlette Cohen Penna	Independent	DIV	0	0.00%		
Total			30,635	100%	28,318	100%
Registered voters			54,197		54,181	
Blank/Void ballots			390	1.26%	830	2.85%
Turnout			31,025	57.24%	29,148	53.80%
Abstentions			23,172	42.76%	25,033	46.20%
Result					UMP HOLD	

=== 2002 ===
Legislative Election 2002: Bouches-du-Rhône's 5th constituency
Party	Candidate	Votes	%	±%
UMP	Renaud Muselier	12,745	42.82	
FN	Marie-Odile Raye	5,399	18.14	
LV	Jean-Luc Bennahmias	5,050	16.97	
DVG	David Gomes	1,795	6.03	
PCF	Marie-Yves Le Dret	1,604	5.39	
Others	N/A	3,170		
Turnout		30,206	63.12	
2nd round result
UMP	Renaud Muselier	17,095	75.54	
FN	Marie-Odile Raye	5,534	24.46	
Turnout		24,928	52.10	
UMP hold				

=== 1997 ===
Legislative Election 1997: Bouches-du-Rhône's 5th constituency
Party	Candidate	Votes	%	±%
RPR	Renaud Muselier	8,677	30.81	
FN	Marie-Odile Rayé	6,692	23.76	
PS	René Olmeta	6,378	22.65	
PCF	Marie-Yves Le Dret	3,099	11.00	
Others	N/A	3,317		
Turnout		29,005	61.13	
2nd round result
RPR	Renaud Muselier	13,433	41.76	
PS	René Olmeta	13,079	40.66	
FN	Marie-Odile Rayé	5,655	17.58	
Turnout		32,895	69.33	
RPR hold				
