= Claire Atangana Bikouna =

Cameroonian lawyer

- Born: Cameroon
- Occupation: lawyer
- Known for: First female to serve as the (Interim) President of the Cameroon Bar Association (2020)

Claire Atangana Bikouna is a Cameroonian lawyer specializing in business law. She was appointed as Acting President of the Cameroon Bar in October 2020.

== Early life and education ==
Claire Atangana Bikouna was born and raised in Cameroon. She obtained her baccalaureate in 1980 at the Chevreul De La Blancarde School in Marseille, France. She holds a master's degree in business law, insurance law option and also holds a degree in law and economics from Aix-Marseille III University in France.

In 1991, she joined the Cameroon Bar and joined forces with Eba'a Manga. She opened her firm in 2012. This firm specializes in business law and is also competent in civil law, international adoption, commercial law, general criminal law, labor law.

== Career ==
Claire Atangana Bikouna was twice a member of the Council of the Bar Association, first from 2008 to 2012 and the second time in 2015. She is responsible for the training of lawyers on internship and representative of the president of the bar in the regions of Center, South and East.

She is a member of the International Union of Lawyers and a Mediator, at the Permanent Center for Mediation and Arbitration of the African Center for Law and Development. She is also an administrator of the Cameroon Investment Promotion Agency (API). Member of the critical rereading workshop of the draft Civil Code and of the committee for developing texts on town planning and housing, She is also part of the anti-corruption unit in a Ministerial department.

At 59 years old and with 29 years of seniority at the Bar, she was chosen as interim President during the extraordinary session of the Council of the Bar Association of Cameroon, held on October 7, 2020. This following the death of Charles Tchakounte Patie, titular President of the Bar, who died on October 4, 2020, following illness in France.

During this interim mandate, she became the general coordinator of the “building a better bar” project presented on April 29, 2022, at the Salomon Tandeng Muna Foundation in Yaoundé.

In 2022, She is among the 50 candidates vying for the election of the new President of the Bar of Cameroon, won by Mbah Eric.
