= Christopher Fomunyoh =

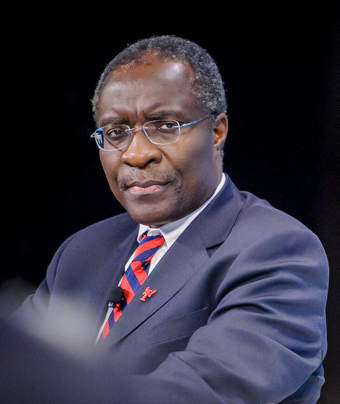
- Fomunyoh at the Halifax International Security Forum 2014

Senior Associate & Regional Director For Africa, NDI

Personal details
- Born: 14 August 1956 (age 69) Guzang, Batibo Sub Division; Cameroon
- Spouse: Mary-Anne Fomunyoh
- Children: Franklin; Brian; Christina
- Occupation: Political Scientist; Civic Advocate; Adjunct faculty at the African Center for Strategic Studies]

Christopher Fomunyoh (born 14 August 1956) is the Senior Associate for Africa and Regional Director at the National Democratic Institute for International Affairs.

== Early life ==
Fomunyoh attended Christian primary education institutions in Guzang, Ambo, and Eka-Bifang, then went on to the Cameroon Protestant College, Bali for secondary school studies, graduating in 1973. He later attended the Cameroon College of Arts, Science and Technology Bambili and obtained the General Certificate of Education Advanced levels in 1975, before proceeding to University of Yaoundé, Faculty of Law and Economics.

== Academia ==
Fomunyoh holds a License en Droit from the University of Yaoundé, 1979; an LL.M. in International Law from Harvard Law School, 1989; and a Ph.D. in political science from Boston University, 1993. He also holds a professional certificate in Air Law from the Université Paul Cézanne Aix-Marseille III. Dr. Fomunyoh is an adjunct faculty at the African Center for Strategic Studies, and a former adjunct professor of African Politics & Government at Georgetown University. He is perfectly articulate in both French and English.

== Career ==
Upon graduation from University of Yaoundé, he worked for the Water Corporation, Societé Nationale des Eaux du Cameroun (SNEC) and later for Cameroon Airlines both in the coastal city of Douala where he established and managed the Legal department for more than six years before departing Cameroon to pursue further studies at Harvard University. Shortly after graduating from Harvard, Fomunyoh served on internships with the Law Offices of the Bank of Boston (USA), and Standard Chartered Bank in Douala, Cameroon. In 1993, he joined the National Democratic Institute as senior program officer. Today, as senior associate and regional director at NDI, Fomunyoh has organized and advised international election observation missions, designed and supervised country specific democracy support programs in partnership with civic organizations, political parties and legislative bodies across Africa. In the course of his work, Fomunyoh interacts regularly with heads of state and government, cabinet ministers, elected officials, political and civic leaders. He recently designed and helped launch the African Statesmen Initiative a program aimed at facilitating political transitions in Africa by encouraging former democratic Heads of State to stay engaged in humanitarian issues, conflict mediation, public health and other key sectors of political economic and human development on the continent. As an authority on democratization in Africa, Fomunyoh is highly solicited by news organizations and makes frequent guest appearances on major mainstream media including Cable News Network, British Broadcasting Corporation, National Public Radio, Voice Of America, Radio France Internationale and Radio Deustche Welle. He provides interviews for print news organizations such as the Los Angeles Times, The New York Times, The Washington Post, Washington Times, Le Monde and 'International Herald Tribune. In one of his multiple media outings, Fomunyoh considered colonial rule as "...a terrible moment in African history and for the world too...", but he also places culpability for Africa’s current problems on what he unambiguously terms "...bad governance and lack of visionary leadership..." Fomunyoh upholds the supremacy of the constitution and strongly objects to distortions of the document to suit personal or sectional whims. He points to the Ghanaian example as schemata for budding democracies. Chris Fomunyoh recently remarked:

It is extremely important to frequently renew political leadership in every country so new leaders can bring a fresh perspective to global trends and developments, and help move their countries in ways that may differ from previously long held typical and traditional approaches.

== Civic advocacy ==
Through his life, work and pronouncements, Christopher Fomunyoh espouses communication even amongst disagreeing parties – dialogue that reaches for compromise by considering the views of all parties involved through ‘yesable’ proposals. Fomunyoh remembers putting this practice to use in the mid 1970s, as one of the executive and founding members of the UNESCO Club at the University of Yaoundé; and before that, in his activist days as a student leader and president of the Moghamo Students Association from 1975 to 1979. Fomunyoh’s Foundation Radio, in Bamenda Cameroon vigorously upholds the creed of ‘Giving Voice to the Voiceless’ and strives to provide a platform for airing the concerns of the silent/impoverished majority and the establishment of the right contacts for obtaining much-needed skills for self-reliance. His family foundation TFF, partners with various traditional civic and administrative institutions within Cameroon to foster these goals. That has earned him encomiums among various Cameroonian constituencies such as: the Sawa Women of Bonendale, Douala in the Littoral region, some of whose cultural and development projects the Fomunyoh Foundation has supported; the Moghamo Women Empowerment Center in Batibo; and the chieftaincy in Dschang in the Western Region where Fomunyoh holds the honorific traditional title of ‘Suffo’.

In the months leading to the 2004 presidential elections in Cameroon, Fomunyoh’s name was touted by various interest groups, parties and independent observers as a potential candidate for the race. A few years before the 2011 presidential contest, speculation is rife in the Cameroonian media of both French and English expression, the blogosphere and the Cameroonian Diaspora about the possibility of a Fomunyoh vs Biya Paul Biya show-down. While many Cameroonians ponder the possibility of holding credible, free and fair elections when the election administration body – ELECAM – is perceived as partisan, they also see 2011, as likely to be an epoch-making poll. Fomunyoh has not dropped a traceable hint about his immediate plans; yet a lot seems to be submerged in the unsaid. His more recent (early this year) comments to the media have been a blend of nostalgia for some aspects of the country of his teenage years and an unflappable optimism for better years ahead and the possibilities and potential for positive and meaningful change for Cameroon and Africa as a whole. Growing calls for Fomunyoh to jump into the political fray in Cameroon represent a variety of things to a variety of people: Cameroonian democrats need a boost to their advocacy efforts in favor of good and accountable governance given the government’s performance; while Cameroonians in the Diaspora would love to see someone at the helm of the state that could use his/her international stature to regain credibility for the country and its reputation on the world stage. Fomunyoh’s silence on the issue of his candidacy is yet to quell the speculation that seems to be growing by the day as 2011 year draws nearer, and as many Cameroonians take personal initiatives to reserve domain names, create Fomunyoh fan clubs and online discussion groups in an effort to persuade and pressure him to step forward and get into the presidential race.
