= Dominique Bénard =

French scoutleader

Deputy Secretary-General of the World Organization of the Scout Movement
- In office August 2004 – April 2007

Dominique Bénard of Bogève, France (born April 19) is former Deputy Secretary-General of the World Organization of the Scout Movement in Geneva, Switzerland, from August 2004 to April 2007. Bénard led the departments of Education, Research and Development at the World Scout Bureau, which includes Youth Participation, Program for Adolescents and Young Adults, Children in Need (Education for All), Recruitment and Formation of Adult Volunteers, 2007 Centenary, and World Events for Young People. Bénard oversaw contact with the European, Arab, and InterAmerican offices.

Prior to this, from September 1990 to April 2000, Bénard was Director of the European Scout Office, in charge of supporting the National Scout Organizations in the European Region. His biggest challenge was the relaunching of Scouting in Central and Eastern Europe after the fall of the Communist régime.

From September 1986 to August 1990, Bénard was Executive Director of the Association pour le Développement des Immigrants (AFDI), running five training centers in the Region of Paris, to support the integration of foreign workers and their families coming from Africa. AFDI specialized in literacy and vocational training.

From August 1983 to August 1986, Bénard was Director of the Volunteers' Service of the Association Française des Volontaires du Progrès (AFVP) the French equivalent of Voluntary Service Overseas or the Peace Corps, in charge of recruiting and training the long term volunteers working on development projects in Africa and in the Caribbean.

From September 1977 to July 1983, Bénard was Executive Commissioner of the Scouts de France, the Chief Executive of the Scout Association in France (about 100,000 members and 120 professionals). From September 1975 to August 1977, Bénard was National Program and Training Commissioner of the SdF, in charge of managing a team to develop youth programs and adult training schemes. From September 1970 to August 1975, Bénard was National Scout Executive of the SdF, the Executive in charge of the Scout section (11 to 15 years old), supporting a team of volunteers and a network of Assistant District Commissioners in charge of the Scout Section (about 18,000 members).

From September 1965 to August 1970, Bénard was in charge of running Ministry of Education psychological examinations, interviews and tests for children facing difficulties of adaptation, and counseling teachers on the way to solve the difficulties. Bénard was also counseling young people on their learning and vocational choices, in Évreux, France.

Bénard graduated from the Lycée de Menton in 1959, and the Université Paul Cézanne Aix-Marseille III in 1965, majoring in psychology.

In 2009, he was awarded the 321st Bronze Wolf, the only distinction of the World Organization of the Scout Movement, awarded by the World Scout Committee for exceptional services to world Scouting.
