= Zouheir Chokr =

Dr. Zouheir Chokr
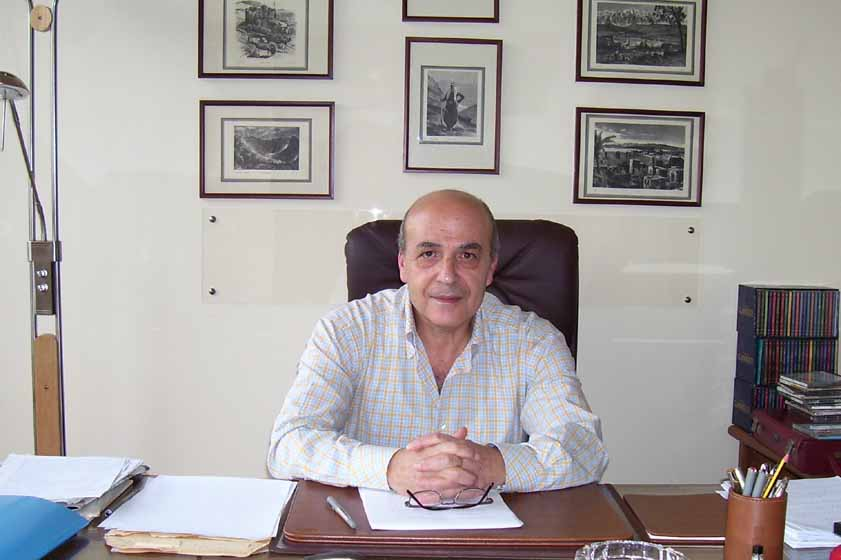
- Zouheir Chokr in 2006

President of the Lebanese University
- In office February 2006 – 2011

Personal details
- Born: Zouheir Ali Chokr; January 21, 1948 (age 78) Bednayel, Lebanon
- Spouse: Leila Natour
- Children: Nadine El-Far, Ali, Jad

Zouheir Chokr (alternative spellings: Zouheir Shokr, Zouheir Chokor, Zouheir Shokor, Zouheir Choker, Zouheir Shoker, Zouhair Chokr, Zouhair Chokor, Zouhair Shokor) (Arabic: زهير شكر) (born 21 January 1948) is a former president of the Lebanese University and former ambassador to Qatar.

== Career ==
Chokr was born in Bednayel in 1948. He received his doctorate in political science from the Université Paul Cézanne Aix-Marseille III, France in 1976. After completing his Ph.D., he was a lecturer at University of Benghazi in Libya until joining the Lebanese University in 1979 as an assistant professor, and in 1984 was promoted to professof. He served as Dean of the Faculty of Economics and Business Administration from 1986 to 1992. Chokr also held a professorship at the Military Academy, was a lecturer at the Staff College of the Lebanese Army, and a professor at the National Institute of Administration, National Service Council. Chokr was Lebanon's ambassador to Qatar from 1994 to 1999, and from 2006 to 2011, he served as president of the Lebanese University.

== Medals ==
Palmes académiques - Officier - France 1993.
Wissam El Istihqaq al Watani - Qatar -1998.
