= Hendrik Davi =

French politician (born 1977)

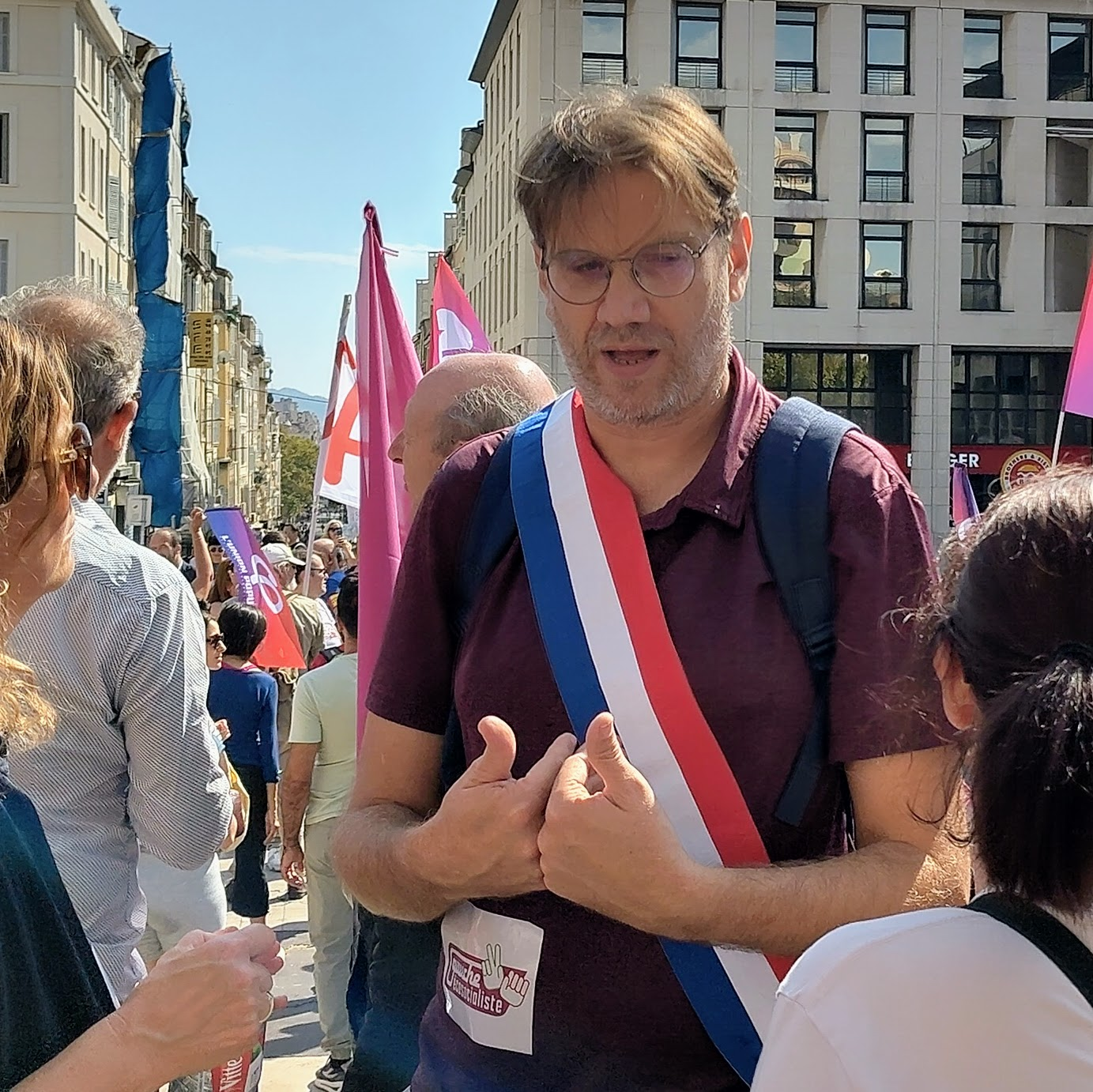

Member of the National Assembly for Bouches-du-Rhône's 5th constituency
- Incumbent
- Assumed office 22 June 2022
- Preceded by: Cathy Racon-Bouzon

Personal details
- Born: 21 December 1977 (age 48) Athis-Mons, France
- Party: L'Après (2024–present)
- Other political affiliations: The Greens (1995–1997); Revolutionary Communist League (2003–2009); New Anticapitalist Party (2009–2013); Ensemble! (2013–2016); La France Insoumise (2016–2024); Ecosocialist Left (2022–present)
- Education: University of Provence, Paris-Sud University

Hendrik Davi (born 21 December 1977) is a French politician formerly of La France Insoumise (LFI) who has been representing Bouches-du-Rhône's 5th constituency in the National Assembly since 2022. He contested the same constituency in the 2017 election, but was narrowly defeated in the second round.

== See also ==
- List of deputies of the 16th National Assembly of France
