= Léon de Berluc-Pérussis =

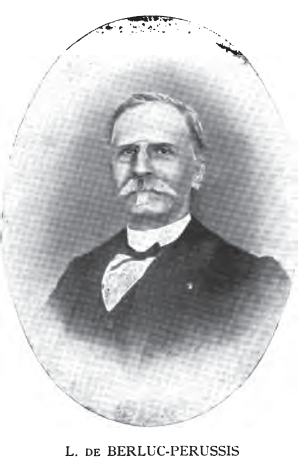
Léon de Berluc-Pérussis

Léon de Berluc-Pérussis (14 June 1835, Apt, Vaucluse – 2 December 1902, Aix-en-Provence) was a French poet and historian in French and Provençal.

== Early life ==
Berluc-Pérussis was born into a Provençal family, who were allied with the Peruzzi family of Florence. The Peruzzi family themselves came from Lombardy and established themselves in Forcalquier, the former capital city of Haute-Provence. Berluc-Pérussis' father and grandfather were both magistrates.

He began his studies at a small seminary in Forcalquier, and, after a brief stay at a high school in Versailles, continued his studies at Bourbon Middle School in Aix-en-Provence. He studied law in Aix-en-Provence and enrolled himself into the bar at the Court of Appeal in 1856.

== Career ==
After having been a Secretary and Vice President of the Conference of Lawyers, he left the law profession to spend his time between Aix-en-Provence and his fatherland Porchères, near Forcalquier, where he occupied himself day after day with the research of the area's local history, as well as with poetry and agriculture.

He was a fervent supporter of decentralization and the social reforms popularized by Pierre Guillaume Frédéric Le Play. He also notably became the editor of "Aptian Mercury" in 1853 and "Afternoon Honeybee" in 1855, Divisional Inspector of the Provence Department of the French Society of Archeology in 1862, a member of the Academy of Aix-en-Provence in 1865, Secretary General of the French Scientific Congress in Aix-en-Provence, at the President of the French Society of Archeology in Nice in 1866.

He was a promoter of the celebration of the 500th anniversary of Petrarch in Avignon in 1874, the President of the Literary Festival of Our-Lady of Provence in Forcalquier in 1875, Major of Félibrige in 1876, Regional Director of the Institute of Provinces and the Honorary President of the French Scientific Congress in Nice in 1878.

== Death ==
He died on 2 December 1902.
