= List of colonial and departmental heads of Mayotte =

This is a list of colonial and departmental heads of Mayotte. Mayotte is a French overseas department and region and single territorial collectivity with a population of about 300,000 located in the Mozambique Channel of the Indian Ocean, between Madagascar and Mozambique, off the coast of Southeast Africa. The chief of state is the French President, who is represented by a Prefect. The president of the General Council acts as head of the government. Elections held in Mayotte include the French presidential vote. A prefect is appointed by the president on the advice of the French Ministry of the Interior. The presidents of the General and Regional Councils are elected by members of those councils.

== List of officeholders ==
(Dates in italics indicate de facto continuation of office)

Term	Incumbent	Notes
French Suzerainty
Annexed by France (annexation ratified 13 June 1843)
Mayotte Protectorate (subordinated to Île de Bourbon/Réunion)
1841 to 13 June 1843	Pierre Passot, Representative	1st time
Subordinated to the Governors of Île de Bourbon/Réunion
13 June 1843 to 11 March 1844	Pierre Passot, Commandant-Superior	1st time
11 March 1844 to 17 June 1844	Paul Charles Rang, Commandant-Superior	
17 June 1844 to 22 October 1844	Charles Louis Thiebault, acting Commandant-Superior	
22 October 1844 to January 1846	Auguste Le Brun, acting Commandant-Superior	
January 1846 to August 1849	Pierre Passot, Commandant-Superior	2nd time
11 August 1849 to 13 June 1851	Stanislas Fortunat Livet, Commissioner	
13 June 1851 to 18 October 1853	Philibert Bonfils, Commissioner	
18 October 1853 to 13 December 1854	André Brisset, acting Commissioner	
13 December 1854 to 15 August 1857	Auguste Joseph Verand, Commissioner	
15 August 1857 to 14 August 1860	Charles Auguste Morel, Commissioner	
14 August 1860 to 14 December 1864	Charles Gabrié, Commissioner	
14 December 1864 to 8 July 1868	Joseph Vincent Christophe Colomb, Commissioner	1st time
8 July 1868 to 15 April 1869	Joseph Ferdinand Hayes, acting Commissioner	
15 April 1869 to 21 May 1869	L.J. Leguay, acting Commissioner	
21 May 1869 to 4 March 1871	Joseph Vincent Christophe Colomb, Commissioner	2nd time
4 March 1871 to 1 March 1875	Patrice Louis Jules Ventre de la Touloubre, Commissioner	Acting to 19 December 1871, 1st time
1 March 1875 to 16 September 1875	Claude Fontaine, acting Commissioner	
16 September 1875 to 26 December 1875	François Marie Ferriez, acting Commissioner	1st time
26 December 1875 to 2 January 1878	Patrice Louis Jules Ventre de la Touloubre, Commissioner	2nd time
2 January 1878 to 9 December 1878	Jean Roblin, acting Commandant	
9 December 1878 to 7 September 1879	Charles Vassal, acting Commandant	
7 September 1879 to 16 December 1879	Charles Bayet, acting Commandant	
16 December 1879 to 31 December 1879	Edouard Sasias, acting Commandant	
31 December 1879 to 3 March 1885	François Marie Ferriez, Commandant	2nd time
3 March 1885 to August 1887	Anne Léodor Philotée Metellus Gerville-Réache, Commandant	
19 August 1887 to 5 September 1887	Paul Louis Maxime Celoron de Blainville, Commandant	
5 September 1887 to 1888	Paul Louis Maxime Celoron de Blainville, Governor	
4 May 1888 to 1893	Pierre Louis Clovis Papinaud, Governor	1st time
25 April 1893 to 30 March 1896	Étienne Théodore Lacascade, Governor	
Mayotte Protectorate (Subordinated to Madagascar)
Subordinated to the Governors-General of Madagascar
30 March 1896 to 1897	Auguste Pereton, acting Administrator-Superior	
5 August 1897 to 11 March 1899	Louis Alexandre Antoine Mizon, Administrator-Superior	
March 1899 to 8 July 1900	Pierre Louis Clovis Papinaud, Governor	2nd time
18 September 1900 to 1902	Pierre Hubert Auguste Pascal, Governor	
1902	Louis Lemaire, acting Governor	
15 October 1902 to May 1904	Alfred Albert Martineau, Governor	
1 June 1904 to 1905	Jules Martin, acting Governor	
1905 to 1906	Jean Auguste Gaston Joliet, Governor	
3 March 1906 to 1907	Fernand Foureau, Governor	
26 December 1907 to 1908	Paul Patté, acting Governor	
8 September 1908 to 1909	Charles Henri Vergnes, Administrator	
31 March 1909 to 1910	Ernest Bonneval, Administrator	
24 February 1910 to 1911	Michel Astor, Administrator	
1 May 1911 to 28 September 1911	Frédéric Estèbe, Administrator	
28 September 1911 to 25 July 1912	Gabriel Samuel Garnier-Mouton, Administrator	
25 July 1912 to 21 July 1975	Part of the Comoros	
Separate colony
21 July 1975 to 1976	Younoussa Bamana, Prefect	Proclaimed by pro-French demonstrators
23 June 1976 to 24 December 1976	Jean Marie Coussirou, Prefect	
French collectivité territoriale (reaffirmed 22 December 1979)
24 December 1976 to 30 April 1978	Jean Marie Coussirou, Prefect	
30 April 1978 to 15 April 1980	Jean Maurice Marie Rigotard, Prefect	
15 April 1980 to 24 January 1981	Philippe Jacques Nicolas Kessler, Prefect	
24 January 1981 to 25 January 1982	Pierre Sevellec, Prefect	
25 January 1982 to 10 May 1982	Yves Bonnet, Prefect	
10 May 1982 to 25 November 1982	Yves Bonnet, Commissioner of the Republic	
5 January 1983 to 1984	Christian Pellerin, Commissioner of the Republic	
1984 to 1986	François Bonnelle, Commissioner of the Republic	
1986	Guy Dupuis, Commissioner of the Republic	
1986 to 24 February 1988	Akli Khider, Commissioner of the Republic	
24 February 1988 to 23 November 1988	Akli Khider, Prefect	
23 November 1988 to 17 October 1990	Daniel Limodin, Prefect	
17 October 1990 to 24 February 1993	Jean-Paul Coste, Prefect	
9 March 1993 to 17 January 1994	Jean-Jacques Debacq, Prefect	
17 January 1994 to 20 February 1996	Alain Weil, Prefect	
20 February 1996 to 15 July 1998	Philippe Boisadam, Prefect	
31 August 1998 to 8 October 2001	Pierre Bayle, Prefect	
8 October 2001 to 4 July 2002	Philippe de Mester, Prefect	
4 July 2002 to 28 March 2003	Jean-Jacques Brot, Prefect	
French overseas collectivité (with the designation collectivité départementale)
28 March 2003 to 17 January 2005	Jean-Jacques Brot, Prefect	
17 January 2005 to 1 February 2007	Jean-Paul Kihl, Prefect	
1 February 2007 to September 2008	Vincent Bouvier, Prefect	
12 September 2008 to 13 July 2009	Denis Robin, Prefect	
13 July 2009 to 17 August 2009	Christophe Peyrel, acting Prefect	
17 August 2009 to 4 July 2011	Hubert Derache, Prefect	
French overseas department
4 July 2011 to 21 July 2011	Patrick Duprat, acting Prefect	
21 July 2011 to 30 January 2013	Thomas Degos, Prefect	
30 January 2013 to 30 July 2014	Jacques Witkowski, Prefect	
31 July 2014 to 5 May 2016	Seymour Morsy, Prefect	
6 May 2016 to 27 March 2018	Frédéric Veau, Prefect	
28 March 2018 to 9 July 2019	Dominique Sorain, Prefect	
10 July 2019 to 23 June 2021	Jean-François Colombet, Prefect	
23 June 2021 to 14 February 2024	Thierry Suquet, Prefect	
14 February 2024 to present	François-Xavier Bieuville, Prefect	

== See also ==
- Politics of Mayotte
- History of Mayotte
