= Isabelle Arvers =

French media art curator, critic and author

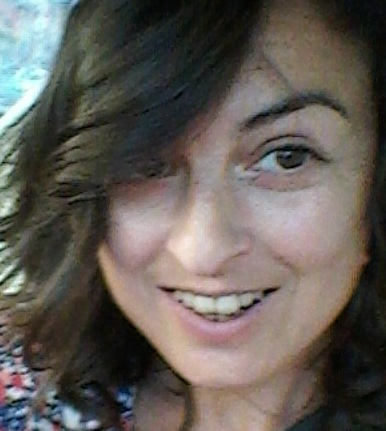
Isabelle Arvers

Isabelle Arvers is a French media art curator, critic, and author specializing in video and computer games, web animation, digital cinema, retrogaming, chiptunes, and machinima. Born in Paris in 1972, she currently lives in Marseille. She has curated exhibitions in France and internationally, exploring the relationship between art, video and computer games, and politics. Additionally, she promotes free and open-source culture, as well as indie games and art games.

== Background ==
Isabelle Arvers graduated from the Institute of Political Studies in Aix-en-Provence and holds a Postgraduate Diploma in Cultural Project Management from Paris 8 University. She has specialized in new media since 1993 and wrote her thesis on "Digital Virtuality as a Way to Apprehend Reality."

She has worked at Ex Machina and Doboi and has participated in Art 3000. Additionally, she coordinates the International Symposium of Electronic Arts (ISEA) in Paris.

== Curating digital media ==
Arvers has curated exhibitions at the Centre Pompidou, including "Video Cuts" in 2001, "Tour of the Web" in 2003, and "Musique 8 Bits" in 2005.

== Retrogaming ==
Playtime is a retrogaming room and game art exhibition curated by Arvers in 2002 for the first edition of the Festival Villette Numérique. This was the first major event dedicated to games and old computer games within a French cultural institution. The concept behind Playtime is to juxtapose the low-tech aesthetics of early gaming computers and consoles with high-tech broadcasting devices (such as screen walls, interactive installations, giant screens, and online devices). This contrast allows the public to appreciate the remarkable advancements in graphics and technology used in video and digital games over the past thirty years while they are playing.

"Game Heroes in Retrogaming" is an exhibition curated by Arvers in 2011 in Marseille. The event explores the history of video games through the iconic heroes who have shaped the imagination of nearly four generations of players, including Pac-Man, Zelda, Mario, Donkey Kong, and Sonic.

== Game art vs Artgames ==
She curated the wireless art event "Wifiledefrance" for the Île-de-France region, where she invited the project Noderunners, a Wi-Fi game in the city. She was also the net.art curator for the 2004 Banana RAM Festival in Italy. Additionally, she curated the exhibition "Gametime, Experimedia," which focused on games, music, and cinema, in Melbourne in October 2004, and "La Nuit Numérique" for the 2004 Bitfilms Festival in Hamburg, Germany, in November 2004.

Her recent exhibition and event projects aim to portray video games as a new language and a means of artistic expression. These include:

- No Fun Games and The Gaming Experience, Bergen, Norway, 2005
- Mal au Pixel, Paris, France, 2006
- Articule 3, emerging Swiss creation, Annecy, France, 2007
- Playing to Real, Meudon, France, 2007
- Gamerz, Aix-en-Provence, France, 2008 and 2009
- Machinima Screenings, Gameplay, and Mostravideo, Brazil, 2009
- Game Heroes, Marseille, France, 2011

She curates machinima programs for various institutions and festivals.

== WJ-s performances ==
She is also a WJ and performs live with online creations through the multiscreen environment WJ-S, created in 2006 by Anne Roquigny. WJ-S is a software and flexible public device for web performances, allowing WJs (webjays, artists, curators, web enthusiasts, and web mutants) to perform live with online text, sound, and visuals.

WJs use the WJ-S software to control a multiscreen setup, navigating multiple browser windows simultaneously from a distance. The system provides a shared, visible interface that allows audiences to follow the browsing process in real time.

Since 2007, Isabelle Arvers has been performing WJ-S presentations on the relationship between art and video games on the web. These performances explore Neen, an art movement that asserts "websites are the art of our day," showcasing websites by artists such as Angelo Plessas, Rafaël Rozendaal, Andreas Angelidakis, Mai Ueda, and Nikola Tosic. Additionally, she conducts WJ-S performances on psychogeography, a Situationist concept, as well as emotional mapping and data visualization.

== Workshops ==
Believing that machinima represents a new art form and mode of expression, she conducts workshops for students and teenagers on machinima—movies created with video games—as well as on WJ-S and how to use this software for performances using the web as a giant hard disk. The goal of these workshops is to demonstrate that mass media can be a tool for creative expression.

She conducts workshops on PLEADE, an online archive publishing open-source application developed by AJLSM. PLEADE assists institutions in publishing archival finding aids encoded in EAD (Encoded Archival Description) on the web by providing a set of tools for building dynamic websites.

== Publications ==
She writes essays and articles on digital art, game art, and machinima for magazines such as Amusement, Digitalarti, MCD, and Multitudes. Her most recent essay, "Cheats or Glitch? Voice as a Game Modification in Machinima," was published by MIT Press in 2010.

- "This Spartan Life, un machinima au congrès," Revue Multitudes, 2012
- "Penser l'œuvre d'art en dehors de l'économie traditionnelle," Archée, 2011
- "Cheats or Glitch? Voice as a Game Modification in Machinima," by Isabelle Arvers in VOICE: Vocal Aesthetics in Digital Arts and Media (MIT Press, 2010), edited by Norie Neumark, Ross Gibson, and Theo Van Leeuwen
- "Electronic Shadow: Habiter l’image," Etapes graphiques, 2010
- "Game in the City," an interview with Blast Theory, Amusement n°7, 2010
- "Low Rez Stories, Kit d’assemblage aléatoire d’histoires du réel," Amusement n°7, 2010
- "Jeux tu perds gagnes," MCD, 2009
- "Player One," Amusement, 2008
- "Let’s Think About Fun!", Musiques et Cultures Digitales, 2008
- "La muséographie au défi de l’immatérialité," Art & Fact n°26, 2007
- "Le jeu vidéo, un moyen d’expression à la portée de tous ?", ARCADI, 2006
- "Servovalve, doseur de temps et de hasard," ARCADI, 2006
- "Neen ou la communication entre les anges," Sklunk.net, 2006
- "Milk, an Artwork by She Lea Cheang," 56K Bastard TV, 2005

== Exhibitions ==
- DIGITAL SALON: Games and Cinema, Maison Populaire, Montreuil, 2011
- GAME HEROES, a retrogaming exhibition, Alcazar, Marseille, 2011
- GAMERZ 5, Brazilian artists, Fondation Vasarely, Aix-en-Provence, 2009
- GAMERZ 4, Aix-en-Provence, 2009
- PLAYING TO REAL, Art and Games exhibition, Meudon, 2007
- ARTICULE 3, Emerging Swiss Creation, Bonlieu Scène Nationale, Annecy, 2007
- MAL AU PIXEL, Mains d’Oeuvres, Saint-Ouen, 2006
- NO FUN! Games and the Gaming Experience, Piksel, Bergen, Norway, 2005
- FRANCE NUMÉRIQUE, VJing and Animation, Bitfilm Hamburg, 2004
- REACTIVATE: Gametime, Experimedia State Library, Melbourne, 2004
- MIND CONTROL, Net.art Section, Banana RAM, Ancona, 2004
- WIFILEDEFRANCE, Wireless Art Event, Région Île-de-France, Paris, 2004
- PLAYTIME, the Retrogaming Room of Villette Numérique, Paris, 2002
- SOUND TOYS, the Online Gallery of Villette Numérique, Paris, 2002

== Machinima screenings ==
- Gamerz 8, ARCADE, Aix-en-Provence, France, 2012
- Gamerz 7, ARCADE, Aix-en-Provence, France, 2011
- Maison Populaire, Montreuil, France, 2011
- What is Machinima? Festival MRFU, Maribor, Slovenia, 2010
- Gamerz 6, ARCADE, Aix-en-Provence, France, 2010
- Mumia, Belo Horizonte, Brazil, 2010
- Gamerz 05, ARCADE, Aix-en-Provence, France, 2009
- Gameplay, Itaú Cultural, São Paulo, Brazil, 2009
- Mostravideo, Belo Horizonte, Brazil, 2009
- Symposium Imagine the Future, Neuchâtel, Switzerland, 2009
- Récréations, Scène Numérique, Aix-en-Provence, France, 2009
- Flash Festival, Centre Pompidou, Paris, France, 2008
- Flash Festival, Centre Pompidou, Paris, France, 2007
- Ciant, Cinema Svetnor, Prague, Czech Republic, 2007
- Animation Film Festival, Annecy, France, 2007
- Flash Festival, Centre Pompidou, Paris, France, 2006
- Némo Festival, Invitation of Chris Burke for This Spartan Life, Espace Cartier, Paris, France, 2006
- Web Plasticians: Machinima vs Demos, Invitation of Burnie Burns from Rooster Teeth Productions, Pompidou Center, Paris, France, 2005

== Conferences ==
- "Voices in Machinima as a Situationist Détournement of Video and Computer Games," ISEA, Istanbul, 2011
- "Levitation in Virtual Reality and Video Games," École d’art, Aix-en-Provence, 2009
- "Art & Collaborative Thinking," École Supérieure d’Art de Bourges, 2009
- "Collaborative Thinking: Economy, Social, Politics, and Art," Haute École d’Art, Genève, 2008
- "Interactivity, Creation, and Video Games," Beaux-Arts de Marseille, 2008
- "Sound Games and Interaction with Virtual Reality," École d’Art, Aix-en-Provence, 2008
- "Network Creation and New Spaces of Exhibition," Haute École d’Art, Genève, 2008
- "Games, Politics, Economy, and Art," Kunsthalle, Wien, Austria, 2008
- "Machinimas: A New Cinematographic Genre," Imaginove, Lyon, 2007
- "Video Art in the Digital Era," 30 Years of Videographies, Liège, Belgium, 2006
- "What is Machinima," Bâtiment d’Art Contemporain, Geneva, 2006
- "Relation Between Art and Video Games in France," Digifrance, HTC, Helsinki, 2006
- "To Play in Family," Cité des Sciences et de l’Industrie, Paris, 2006
- "Games vs Networks," École Supérieure de l’Image, Poitiers, 2006
- "Reactivate: Curatorial Talk," Symposium Game Time, ACMI, Melbourne, 2004
- "French Digital Creation," School of Visual Arts, New York, 2004
- "How to Curate New Media," Pompidou Center, Paris, 2004
- "Art and Video Games," Fine Art School, Dijon, 2004
- "The Web Documentary," General Meeting of Documentary, Lussas, 2003
- "Curating New Media in a Game Room," Festival Transmediale 03, Berlin, 2003
- "Video Games and Electronic Music," Pompidou Center, Paris, 2002
- "How to Distribute Short Films on the Net," Pompidou Center, Paris, 2001
