= IAE Aix-en-Provence =

Coordinates: 43.5865°N 5.4231°E

IAE Aix-Marseille Graduate School of Management
- Institut d'Administration des Entreprises d'Aix-en-Provence
- Type: Public University
- Established: 1955; 71 years ago
- Director: Antonin Ricard
- Location: Aix-en-Provence, France
- Website: www.iae-aix.com

The Aix-Marseille Graduate School of Management, also known as IAE Aix-en-Provence or IAE Aix, is a business school in the South of France, part of Aix-Marseille University, the largest University in the French-speaking world, founded in 1409.

In 2022, the Financial Times ranked its Masters in Management program 67th in the world. In 2013, it is awarded by Eduniversal business schools ranking by Palmes as a "3 palmes - EXCELLENT Business School". It is also continuously ranked by Financial Times, with an average rank of 3 years at No. 45.

== Faculty ==
The school is composed of 40 permanent faculty members, and invites more than 30 international professors and 150 business speakers each year to conduct lectures and courses within the various programmes.

== Accreditation and recognition ==
Aix-Marseille Graduate School of Management is a business school in the French public university system:

- The school was the first public School of Management in France (created in 1955).
- It is the first and only public Graduate School in France to be awarded both the EQUIS since 1999 and AMBA accreditation for its MBA Change & Innovation in 2004, its Masters in Management in 2005, its Executive Par-Time MBA and Euro MBA in 2007.
- Aix-Marseille Graduate School of Management is the only public Graduate School in France to be ranked by Financial Times since 2010

== Programs Offered ==
The school offers graduate level programs in:
- General management: for students coming from other fields and want to have a double competencies in management.
- International management: for students who want to do business development abroad.
- Internal audit of organisations: for students who want to do internal and external auditing and control.
- Service management: for students who want to learn to manage a team strategically at operational level.
- Internal and external communications management
- Management in information system
- International financial management: for students who want to be in corporate financial functions
- Marketing: The Master in Marketing is well recognized among market research companies for the high level of statistical skills developed by the students.
Prior to the merger of the three Aix-Marseille Universities in January 2012 it was part of the Paul Cézanne University, Aix-Marseille III.

Aix-Marseille Graduate School of Management also maintains exchange agreements with several universities in 33 countries across Europe, Africa, Asia and America.

Since 2006, IAE is also offering the IMMIT program, which is short for International Master in Management of IT. This is a triple degree program jointly offered by Tilburg University in the Netherlands and University of Turku in Finland.

=== Doctoral program ===
IAE Aix is well known for its Ph.D in Marketing, Strategy, HR and Finance, one of the most prestigious in France with Paris Dauphine University and IAE Grenoble (Institut d'administration des entreprises de Grenoble). The École supérieure des sciences économiques et commerciales (ESSEC) and IAE Aix-en-Provence have a combined doctoral program. IAE AIx has also partnerships with INSEAD, EDHEC Business School (Ecole des Hautes Etudes Commerciales du Nord), KEDGE Business School, and Skema Business School.

== Research ==
The IAE Aix hosts the Aix-Marseille University Center for Research in Management (CERGAM), and has been ranked "A" by the AERES (Evaluation Agency for Research and Higher Education). The CERGAM is composed of IAE Aix, College of Economics and Management, and IMPGT (Institut de Management Public et de Gouvernance Territoriale).

The CERGAM, with Paris Dauphine University and IAE Grenoble (Institut d'administration des entreprises de Grenoble), is one of the main producers of PhD thesis and one of the oldest center for research in management in France.

The La Londe Conference is an international research seminar in marketing organized by IAE Aix since 1974. It is held every year late May or early June.

== Alumni ==
- Guillaume Faury : CEO of Eurocopter, 1st helicopter producer of the world from 2013 to 2018, and CEO of Airbus since April 2019
- Jacques Sénéca : Executive vice-president of Gemalto, world leader of numeric security
- Marie-Arlette Carlotti : Political woman, French minister and deputy
- François Beaudonnet : TV journalist, specialist of European problematics
