= Cathy Racon-Bouzon =

French politician

Member of the National Assembly for Bouches-du-Rhône's 5th constituency
- In office 21 June 2017 – 21 June 2022
- Preceded by: Sylvie Andrieux
- Succeeded by: Hendrik Davi

Personal details
- Born: 22 November 1976 (age 49) Domont, France
- Party: La République En Marche!
- Education: ESCP Europe

Cathy Racon-Bouzon (born 22 November 1976) is a French politician from En Marche. She served as the member of the National Assembly for Bouches-du-Rhône's 5th constituency, which includes the 4th arrondissement of Marseille as well as parts of its 5th and 6th arrondissements.

== Political career ==
In parliament, Racon-Bouzon served as member of the Committee on Cultural Affairs and Education. In addition to her committee assignments, she was part of the French-American Parliamentary Friendship Group. In 2020, Racon-Bouzon joined En commun (EC), a group within LREM led by Barbara Pompili.

In the 2022 French legislative election, she was once again challenged by Hendrik Davi from La France Insoumise in the second round, but lost her seat.

== Political positions ==
In July 2019, Racon-Bouzon decided not to align with her parliamentary group's majority and became of 52 LREM members who abstained from a vote on the French ratification of the European Union’s Comprehensive Economic and Trade Agreement (CETA) with Canada.

== Other activities ==
- Centre Pompidou, Member of the Supervisory Board
