= Thomas Degos =

French official

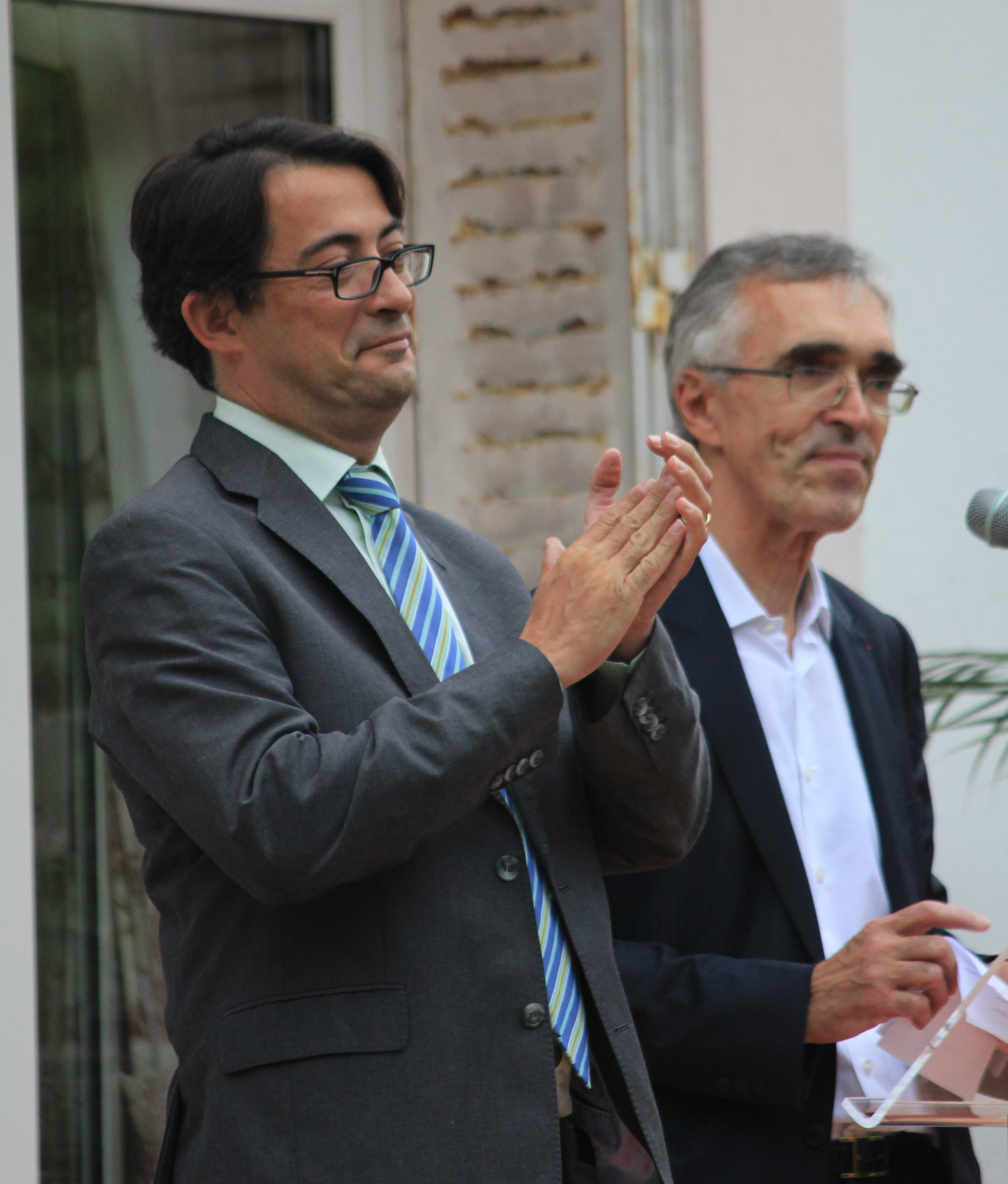
Thomas Degos (left) in 2015.

Thomas Degos (born 28 December 1971) is a French official. He was the Prefect of Mayotte from 21 July 2011, having succeeded acting Prefect Patrick Duprat, to 30 January 2013. He was succeeded by Jacques Witkowski.

== Early life ==
Thomas Degos was born 28 December 1971 in Neuilly-sur-Seine, Hauts-de-Seine, France. He attended Stanislas College between 1982 and 1989. From 1989 to 1991, he attended a preparatory class for the Grandes Ecoles at Stanislas (hypokhâgne S and Khâgne S). He obtained a degree in history and a master's degree in literature from the University of Paris-Sorbonne (Paris IV) in 1994.

He was admitted to Sciences Po Aix in 1992, public service section, and left in 1994. From that date, he followed a DEA in philosophy at the École des School for Advanced Studies in the Social Sciences, then he began a thesis in philosophy under the direction of Pierre Manent. At that time, he followed the seminars of Marcel Gauchet.

He was admitted in 1996 to the Regional Institute of Administration in Lille. He was admitted the same year 1996 to the École nationale d'administration, in the Cyrano de Bergerac promotion (1997-1999).

== Career ==
He joined the body of civil administrators, sub-prefect, director of the cabinet of the prefect of Pyrénées-Orientales. He was the Prefect of Mayotte from 21 July 2011, having succeeded acting Prefect Patrick Duprat, to 30 January 2013. He was succeeded by Jacques Witkowski.

== Personal life ==
Married, he has three children.
