= Hubert Derache =

French politician

Hubert Derache (born 5 May 1953 in Morteau, France) is a French civil servant who served as the Prefect of Mayotte from 17 August 2009 to 4 July 2011, having been appointed by order-in-council of the Council of Ministers of France on 2 July 2009.

== Biography ==
Derache is married and the father of four children.

He chose a career as prefect after a first career of officer in the French infantry, lasting 17 years.

== Studies and military career ==
Hubert Derache enlisted in 1973, following a time in school and army corps of infantry as Head of Section and Unit Commander in France and its overseas territories, and in Lebanon under UN auspices. He was also senior officer and chief of staff to a general commanding a division.

Between 1974 and 1976, he trained at the École spéciale militaire de Saint-Cyr, obtaining a DESS in history in 1976 and a DESS in management in 1990. The same year he received a diploma in superior military teaching.

During his civil service, Derache followed his graduate management studies from 2001 to 2002, then territorial studies at Level III from 2008 to 2009.

== Start of civil service career ==
Derache left his military service to begin a civil service career on 1 August 1990, becoming director of the office of prefect of Aveyron. He was sub-prefect of Jonzac from 1991 to 1993, and in 1994 became sub-prefect 1st class.

In 1993 he became secretary-general of the prefecture of Haute-Marne and became sub-prefect of Marin, in Martinique, in 1997, becoming on this occasion sub-prefect hors classe, in 2000, which offered him at the end of the year, on 21 December, the post of sub-prefect 1st category of Tour-du-Pin.

In 2002 Derache began to work at the Outre-mer (overseas) Ministry; on 15 May 2002 under the administration of minister Brigitte Girardin and her successor François Baroin, in charge of cross-discipline monitoring of Mayotte, and later, Saint-Pierre et Miquelon as well.

He held his last sub-prefect position at Aix-en-Provence from 11 September 2006 until 2009, when he left to become prefect of Mayotte.

== Prefect of Mayotte ==
Named prefect of Mayotte in 2009, Derache had, among other things, the role of intervening in labour strikes that caused economic problems in Mayotte, blocking the budget of the General Council of Mayotte on account of the organism's deficit, to be worried about the problems of undocumented aliens, and several other tasks that permit Mayotte to operate smoothly.

Derache had previously been technical advisor to the Minister of Outre-Mer Brigitte Girardin for three years, with responsibility for monitoring Mayotte. He therefore knew Mayotte and its files well, and he had already come there before being named prefect.

== Decorations ==
- Chevalier (knight) of the National Order of the Legion of Honour
- Chevalier (knight) of the Ordre national du Mérite
- Chevalier (knight) of the Ordre du Mérite Maritime
- Médaille commémorative d'outre-mer
- Silver medal, Médaille de la Défense nationale
- Médaille UNIFIL
