= Jeremy Houghton =

British artist

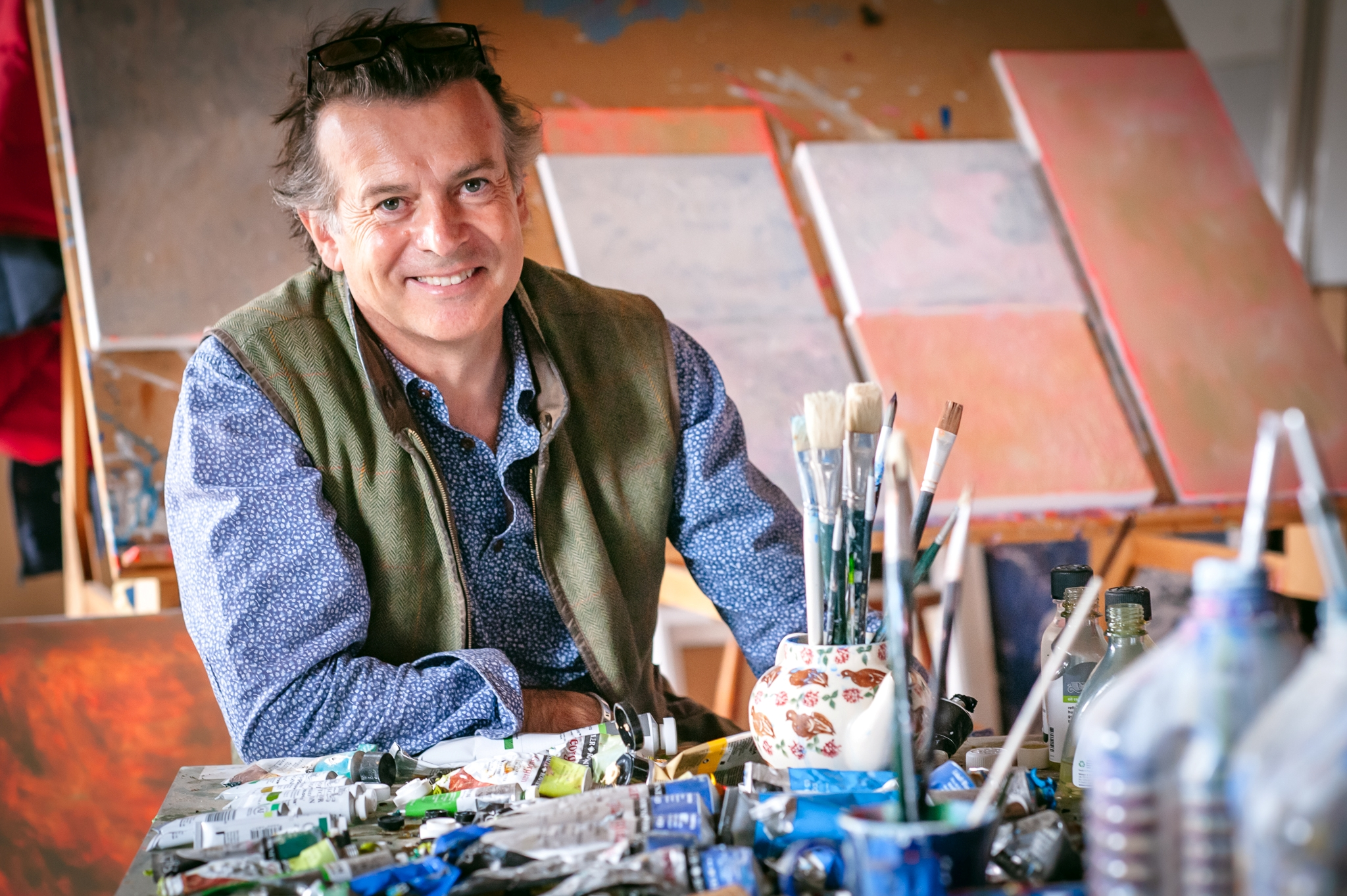
Jeremy Houghton - Artist in Residence

Jeremy Houghton (born 13 June 1974) is an internationally recognized British artist in residence who paints primarily with oils and watercolours.

== Early career ==
After graduating with a degree in law, Houghton went on to study at the Slade School of Fine Art and the Universite de Provence, before becoming head of art at the International School of Cape Town, where he taught for five years.

== Next steps ==
In 2009, Houghton was commissioned to paint HM The Queen presenting a new riband to Her Majesty's Gentlemen at Arms on the occasion of their Quincentenary, and his reputation as a collected artist gathered prominence. Following a solo exhibition at the Saatchi Gallery London in 2010, his international reputation was established and exhibitions at the Everard Read Gallery, Johannesburg, RSA, and The Visual Arts Gallery, Delhi, India, followed in 2011 and 2012. His skill in depicting movement and light led to his selection as one of the Official BT Olympic Artists for London 2012. In the same year, Houghton received an award from the Society of Equestrian Artists for ‘Best Sporting Artist’.

== Artwork ==
In 2013, Houghton was invited to become Artist in Residence at Highgrove, the Royal estate of the Prince of Wales, resulting in an exhibition ‘A Portrait of Highgrove’. This series of monochromatic watercolours ‘truly capture the spirit of Highgrove and the Home Farm' showing how farming communities adapt year in and year out to work in harmony with nature. In the summer of 2013, Houghton became Tour Artist for the Aston Martin Centenary Tour of Europe, where he drove with the Tour during the day and painted each night. These Aston Martin watercolours are now in private collections around the world.

In August 2014, the Ashmolean Museum, Broadway staged a ten-year retrospective of his paintings in its new contemporary art space. The exhibition's hard-backed catalogue featured an essay by Jim Brook, who wrote: "by emphasizing the dynamic forces of motion and light, he [Houghton] invites us to speculate upon the condition of looking, our changing perception of reality, the different ways in which we represent the visual world, and how the compulsion to represent shapes our grasp of reality."

In Houghton's paintings, the image substantiates the ebb and flow of the artist's processes; a transformation which he utilizes to reflect upon his observations and experiences of daily life and human activity. The different contexts of work, sport and war foreground his perception of the specific human gestures and actions which disclose them. If the disappearance of the moment is common to all these theatres of life, so is the idea of completion, not only of an event, but of every action towards its end. Similarly, Houghton's paintings describe images of closure, but this fixed moment is also traceable to the motion of the hand and brush, and the formulations of paint and surface that individuate them.

During 2015, Houghton received another Royal appointment by becoming artist-in-residence at HM The Queen's Windsor Castle estate. His access to events behind its closed doors led to a series of paintings that captured the heartbeat of life inside the castle, the stables and the mews.

As a source for artistic expression, the theme of witnessing an unfolding of international events alongside the momentary scenes of daily life continued to evolve at Goodwood House where he became artist-in-resident for Lord March. In recording life in the house, on the farm, in the gardens, forests and surrounding countryside, Houghton created a collection of art works that captured the atmosphere and essence of a place in which a working community mingles with contemporary and historical artefacts and events of cultural and sporting significance.

Since 2015, Houghton has completed work for Land Rover BAR, documenting Sir Ben Ainslie's attempt to win the America's Cup with a state-of-the-art British-built catamaran.

Houghton has also been appointed resident artist for the 2017 Wimbledon tennis championships, and for the RAF centenary (2018) Houghton created group portraits of the surviving airmen who flew in World War 2

September 2021 sees the publication of An Artist in Residence a book written by the art critic Colin Cameron. A book signing and interview quickly follows at the Royal Academy of Art in Piccadilly. Artist and critic discuss Houghton's career to date including the fascinating residencies in sportings most elite institutions, royal palaces and military barracks.

In June 2022, the artist was invited to present a painting of one of HRH The Queen's favourite racehorses, Dunfermline, at the Epsom Derby as part of the Jubilee celebrations. The Queen described Dunfermline as ‘her best horse ever who won just about everything’ in the 70's. Commissioned as a gift, Houghton felt under pressure to get every detail just right, as the Queen knew the horse so well! The painting now hangs in Sandringham House.

== Additional projects ==
In addition to these official residencies, Houghton created the large-scale rural art installation Glassground. The work in progress relates to his many experiences as an artist in residence in that its arrangement of earth, water and architectural structure draws on similar themes of space, light and movement. In Glassground, a heightened sense of the liminal spaces we often encounter is conveyed through the diffusion of light and shadow on natural and man-made surfaces, and natural effects such as reflection. Glassground invites visitors into a contemplative, observant, and sensory relationship with a transparent building and its situation in nature; the experience is not unlike that of Houghton's as an artist in residence. Amidst shifting conditions, multiple viewpoints and contrasting terrain, visitors become aware of the subjective processes through which they engage with the external world, with rural buildings and places; how they move between external and internal spaces, and how they remember such journeys and places.
