= Aix-en-Provence =

City and commune in Southern France

Aix-en-Provence Ais de Provença (Occitan)
- Subprefecture and commune
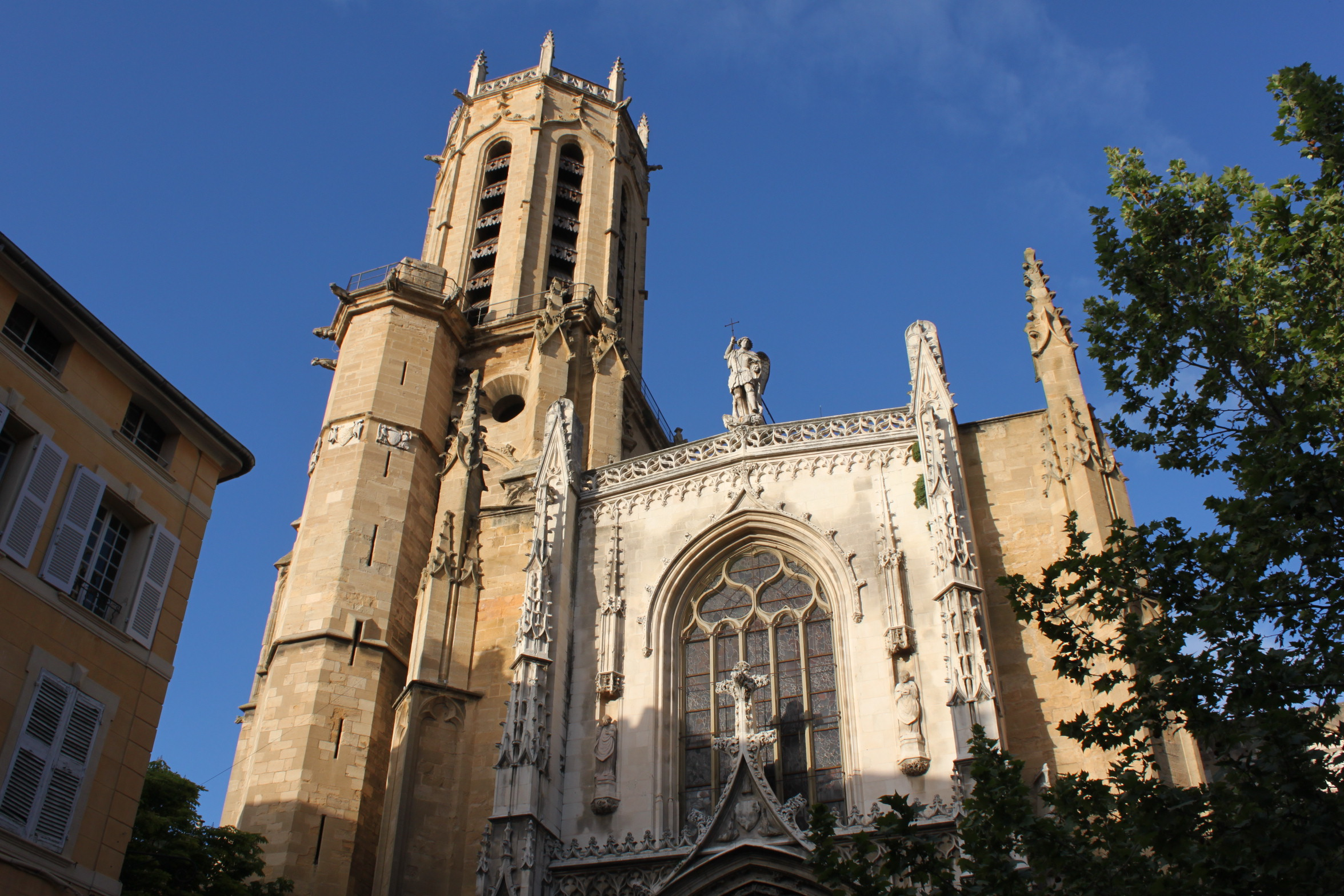
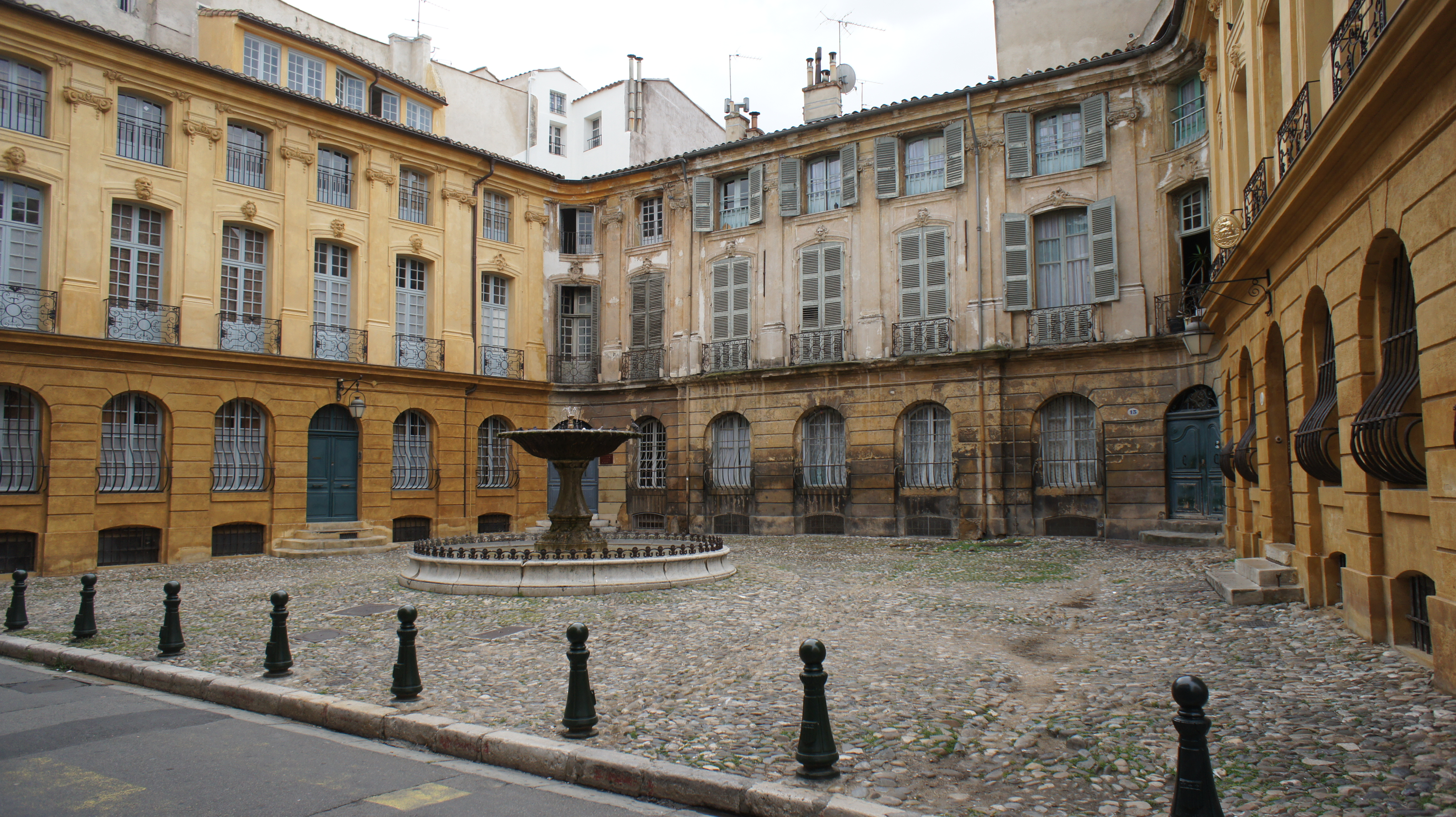
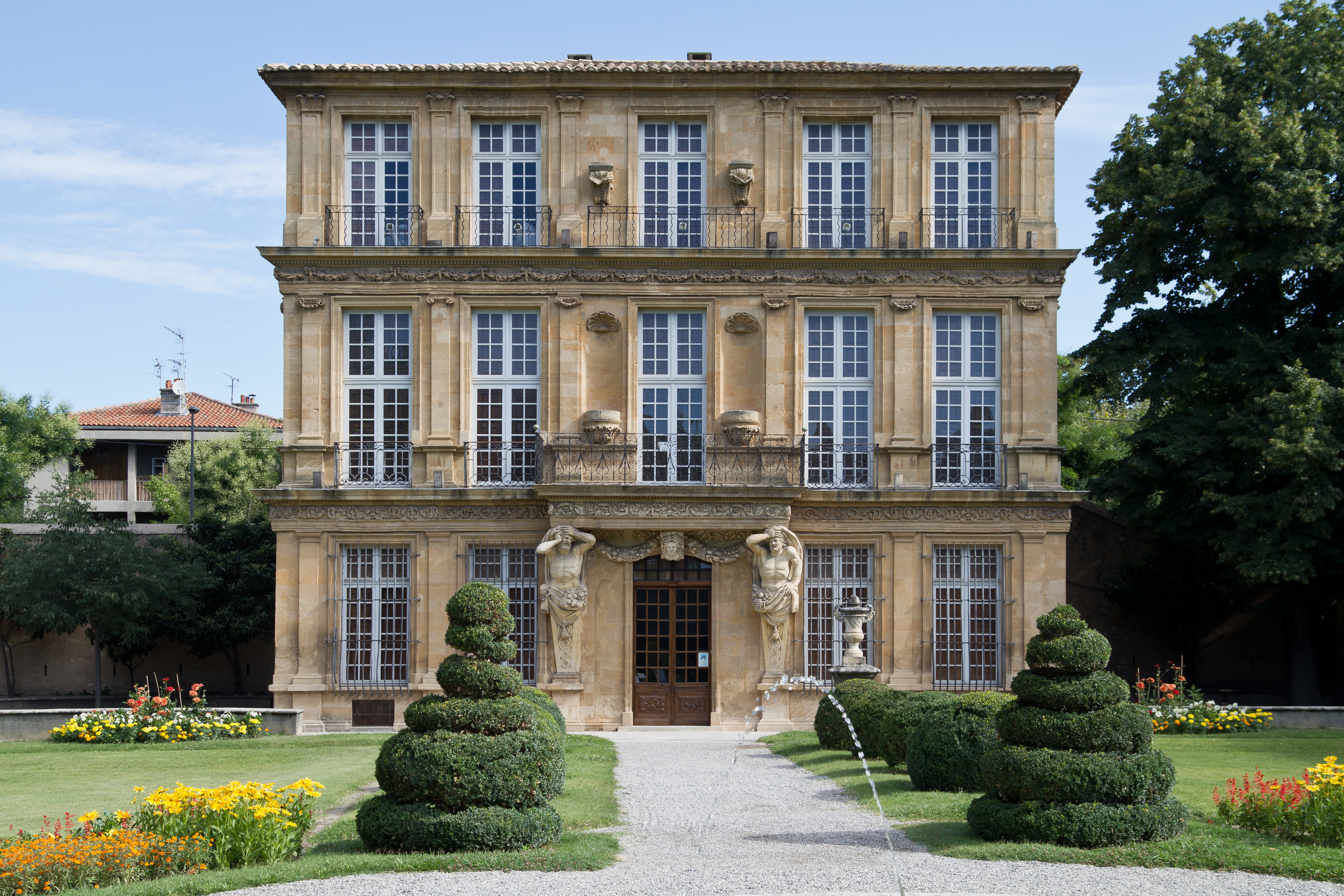
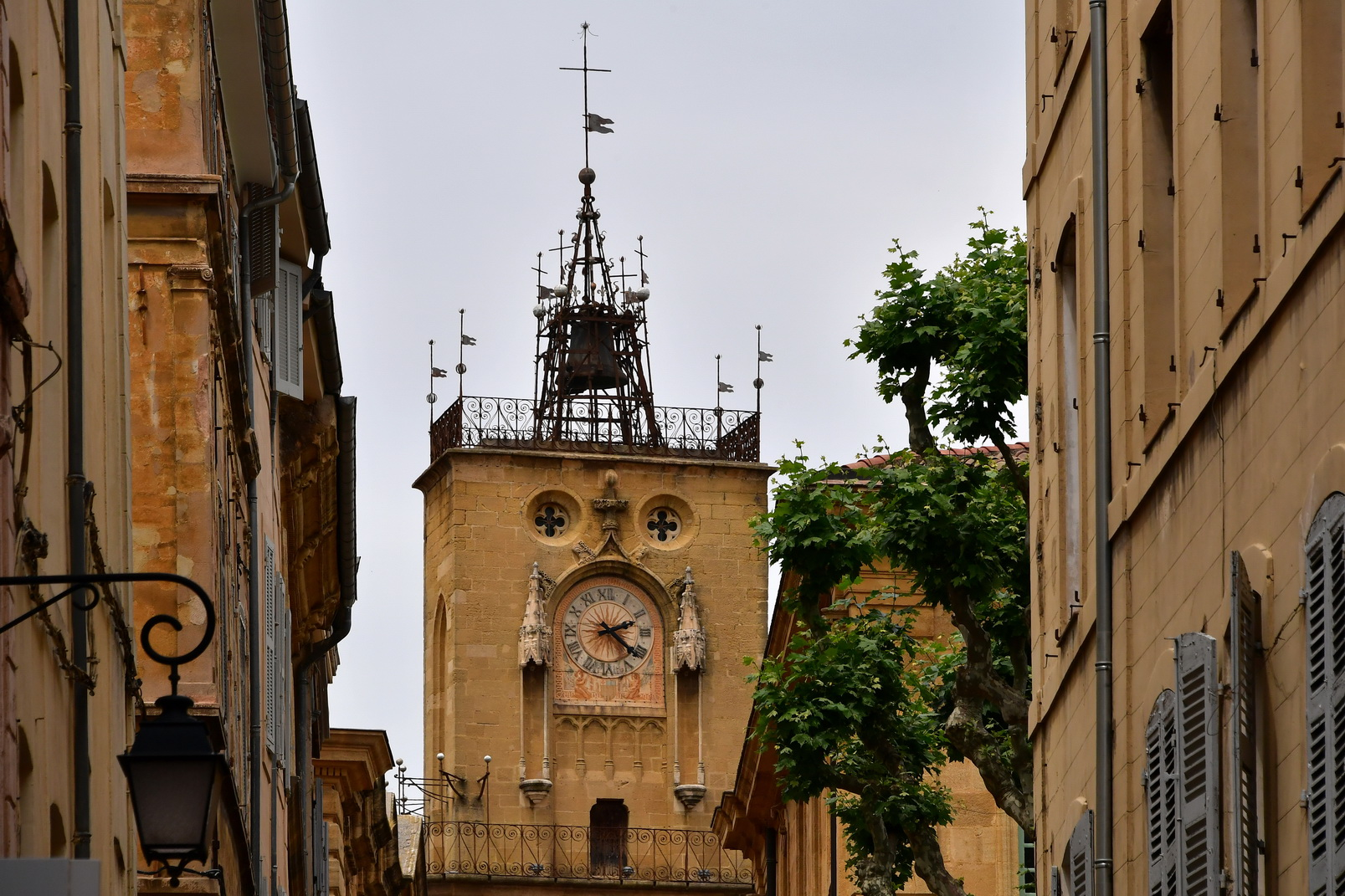
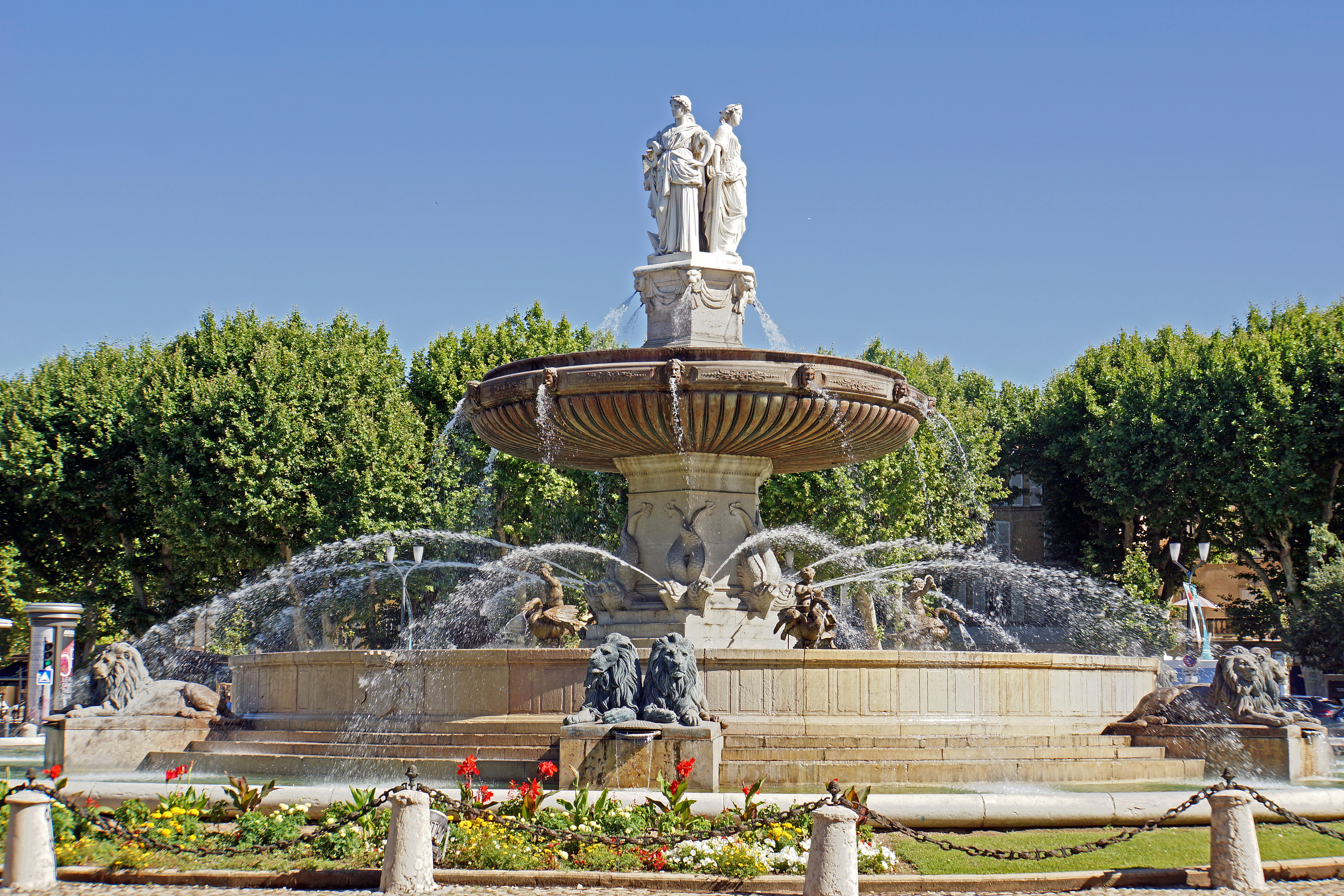
- Aix Cathedral Place d'Albertas Pavillon Vendôme Hôtel de Ville Fontaine de la Rotonde

- Flag Coat of arms
- Location of Aix-en-Provence
- Location within France Location within Provence-Alpes-Côte d'Azur
- Coordinates: 43°31′35″N 5°26′44″E
- Country: France
- Region: Provence-Alpes-Côte d'Azur
- Department: Bouches-du-Rhône
- Arrondissement: Aix-en-Provence
- Canton: Aix-en-Provence 1 Aix-en-Provence 2
- Intercommunality: Aix-Marseille-Provence

Government
  - Mayor (2026–32): Sophie Joissains
- Area^{1}: 186.083 km^{2} (71.847 sq mi)
- Elevation: 173 m (568 ft)
- Population (2023): 149,695
  - Density: 804.453/km^{2} (2,083.52/sq mi)
- Demonym(s): Aixois, Aquisextain, Aquisestain (masculine); Aixoise, Aquisextaine, Aquisestaine (feminine)
- Time zone: UTC+01:00 (CET)
  - Summer (DST): UTC+02:00 (CEST)
- INSEE/Postal code: 13001 /13100, 13090
- Website: aixenprovence.fr
- ^{1} French Land Register data, which excludes lakes, ponds, glaciers > 1 km^{2} (0.386 sq mi or 247 acres) and river estuaries.

Aix-en-Provence, (Note: UK: /ˌɛks ɒ̃ prɒˈvɒ̃s/, US: /ˌeɪks ɒ̃ proʊˈvɒ̃s, ˌɛks -/; French: [ɛks ɑ̃ pʁɔvɑ̃s]; Provençal: Ais de Provença in classical norm, or Ais de Prouvènço in Mistralian norm, pronounced [ˈajz de pʀuˈvɛnsɔ]) often known as simply Aix, is a city and commune in southern France, about 30 km (20 mi) north of Marseille. A former capital of Provence, it is the subprefecture of the arrondissement of Aix-en-Provence, in the department of Bouches-du-Rhône, in the region of Provence-Alpes-Côte d'Azur. The population of Aix-en-Provence is approximately 148,000. Its inhabitants are called Aixois or, less commonly, Aquisextains.

== History ==
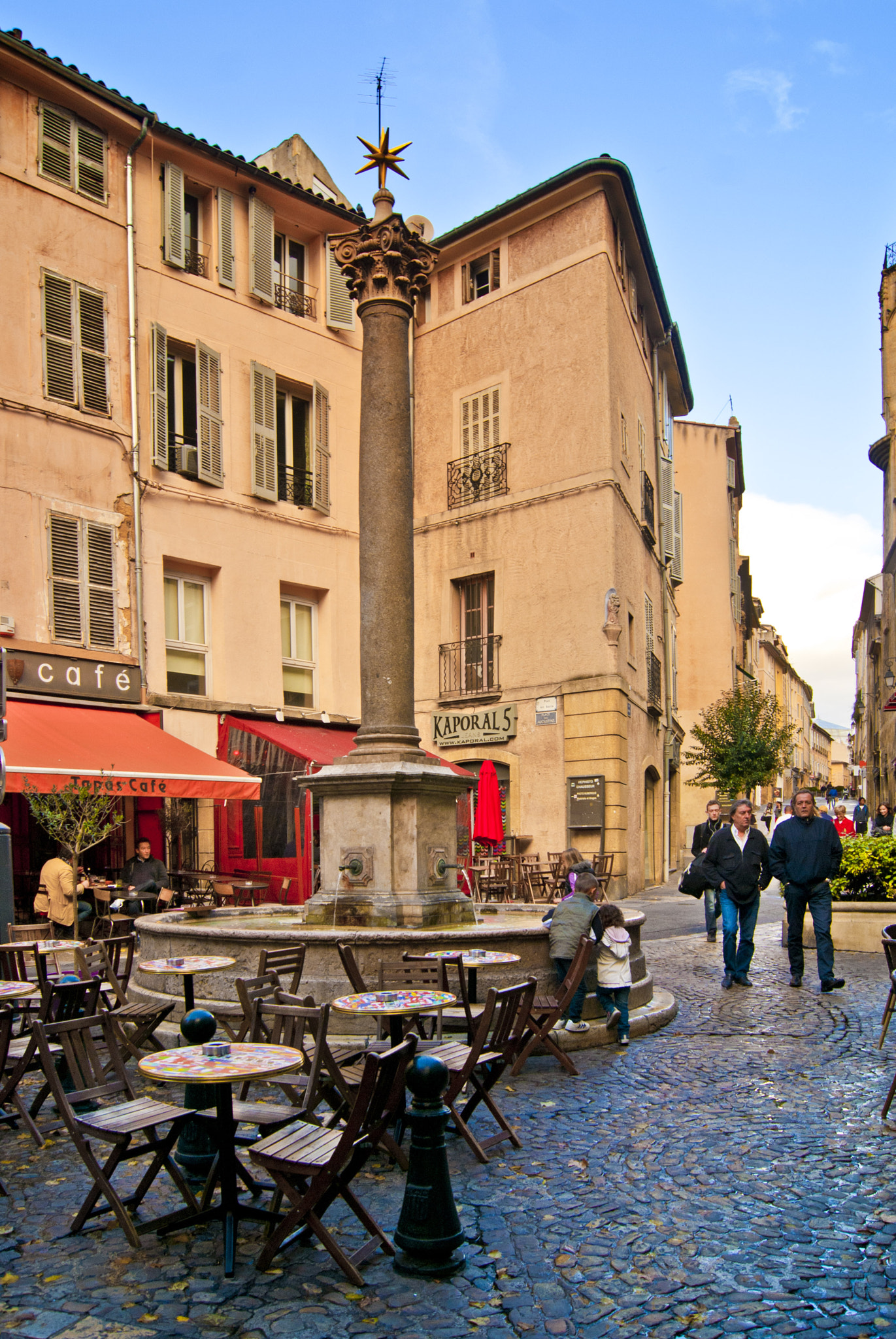
Rue Espariat in November 2013

Aix (Aquae Sextiae) was founded in 123 BC by the Roman consul Sextius Calvinus, who gave his name to its springs, following the destruction of the nearby Gallic oppidum at Entremont. In 102 BC its vicinity was the scene of the Battle of Aquae Sextiae, where the Romans under Gaius Marius defeated the Ambrones and Teutones, with mass suicides among the captured women, which passed into Roman legends of Germanic heroism.

In the 4th century AD it became the metropolis of Narbonensis Secunda. It was occupied by the Visigoths in 477. In the succeeding century the town was repeatedly plundered by the Franks and Lombards and was occupied by the Saracens in 731 and by Charles Martel in 737. Aix, which during the Middle Ages was the capital of Provence, did not reach its zenith until after the 12th century, when, under the houses of Barcelona/Aragon and Anjou, it became an artistic centre and seat of learning.

Aix passed to the crown of France with the rest of Provence in 1487, and in 1501 Louis XII established there the parliament of Provence, which existed until 1789. In the 17th and 18th centuries, the town was the seat of the Intendance of Provence. Current archeological excavations in the Ville des Tours, a medieval suburb of Aix, have unearthed the remains of a Roman amphitheatre. A deposit of fossil bones from the Upper Continental Miocene gave rise to a Christian dragon legend.

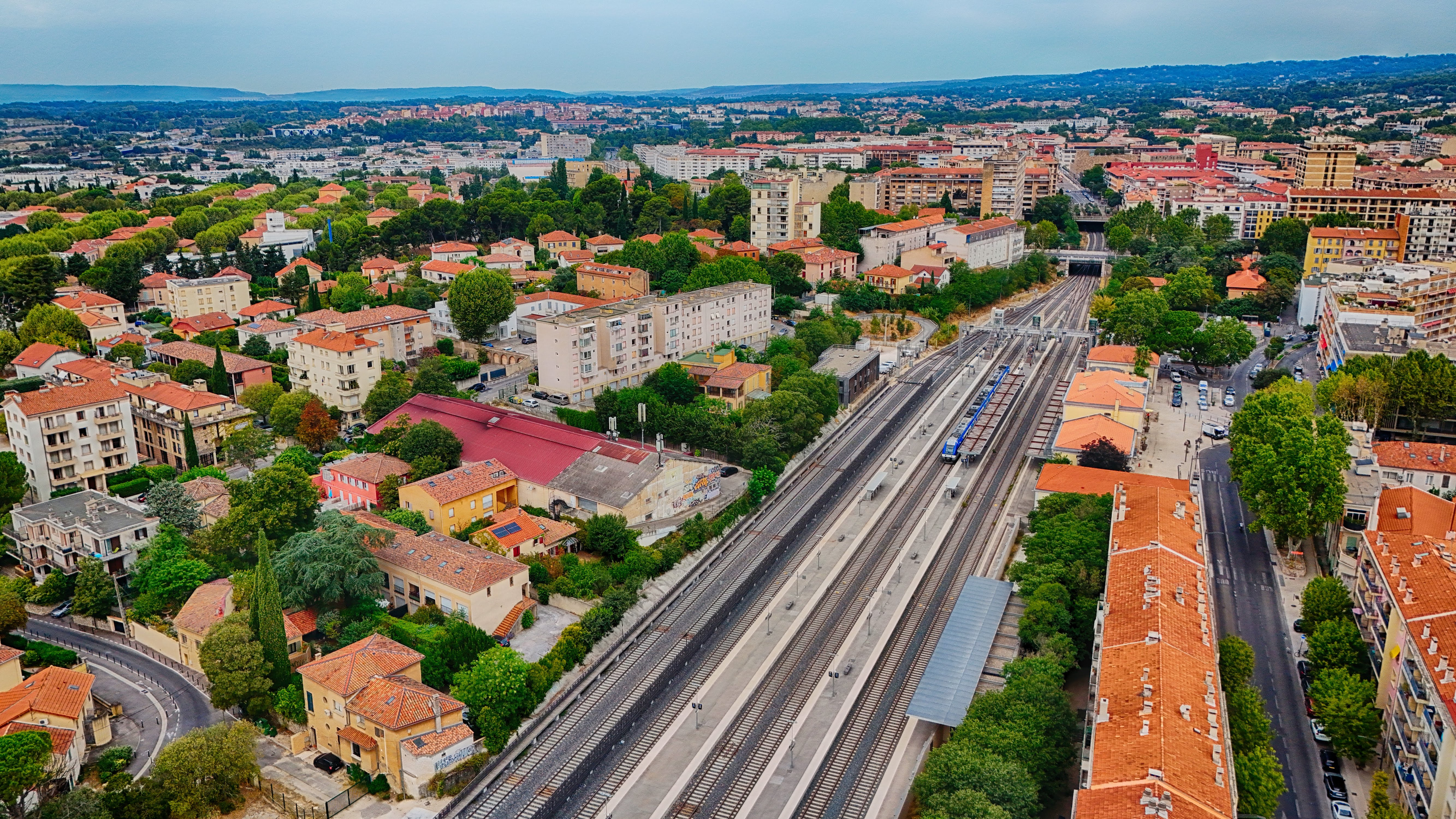
Aix-en-Provence station from the air

== Geography and climate ==
Aix-en-Provence is situated in the south of France, in a plain overlooking the Arc river, about 1.5 kilometres (1 mi) from the right bank of the river. The city slopes gently from north to south and the Montagne Sainte-Victoire can easily be seen to the east. Aix's position in the south of France gives it a warm climate, though more extreme than Marseille due to the inland location. It has an average January temperature of 6 °C (43 °F) and a July average of 24 °C (75 °F). It has an average of 300 days of sunshine and only 58 days of rain. While it is partially protected from the Mistral, Aix still occasionally experiences the cooler and gusty conditions it brings.

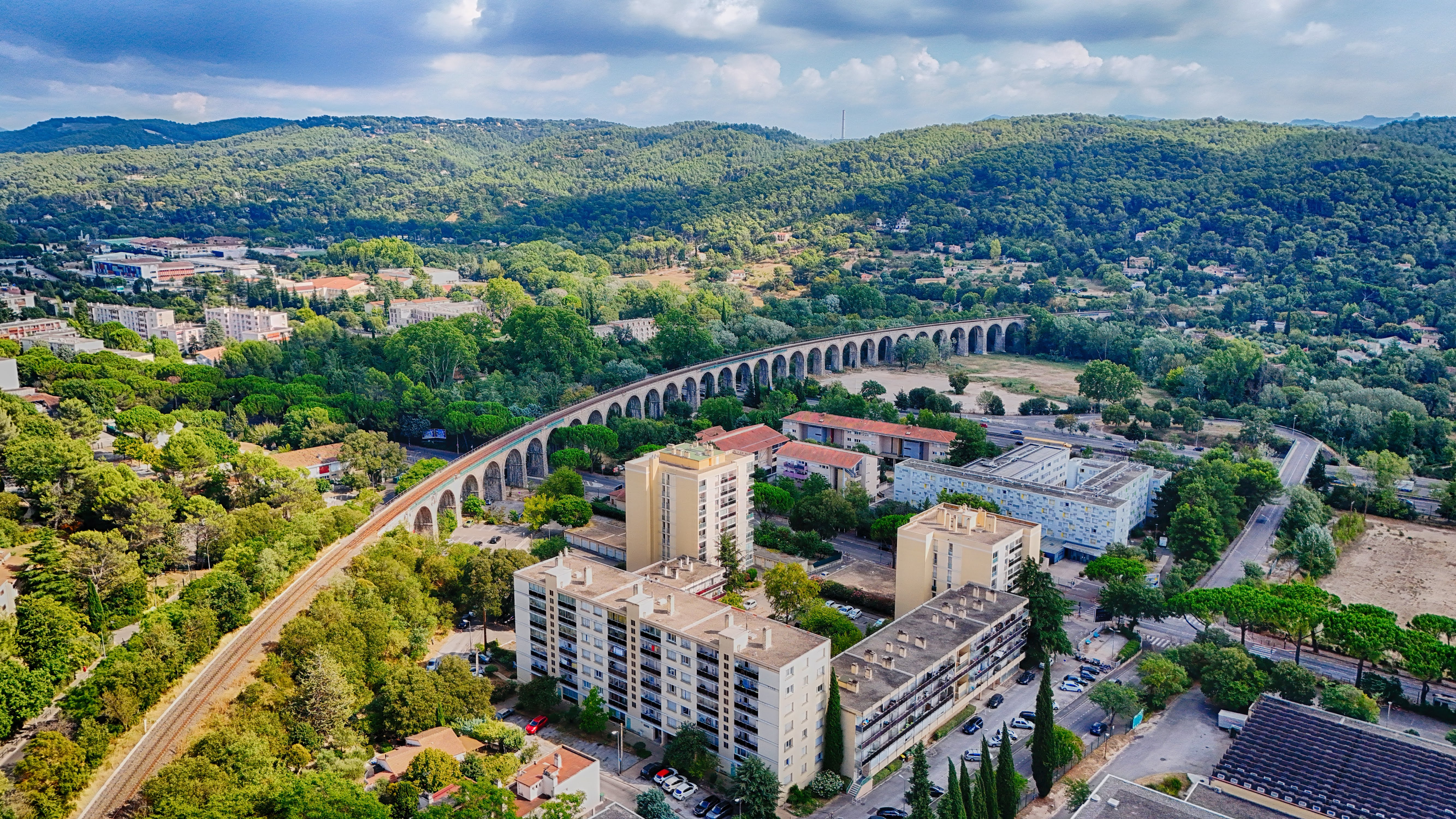
View of the rail viaduct

Like most of the south of France, Aix-en-Provence has a Mediterranean climate (Köppen Csa).

Climate data for Aix-en-Provence, elevation: 173 m (568 ft) (1991–2020 normals, extremes 1955–present)
Month	Jan	Feb	Mar	Apr	May	Jun	Jul	Aug	Sep	Oct	Nov	Dec	Year
Record high °C (°F)	20.9 (69.6)	22.8 (73.0)	25.6 (78.1)	28.9 (84.0)	34.2 (93.6)	42.0 (107.6)	40.2 (104.4)	40.1 (104.2)	35.1 (95.2)	31.4 (88.5)	24.7 (76.5)	22.7 (72.9)	42.0 (107.6)
Mean daily maximum °C (°F)	11.8 (53.2)	12.8 (55.0)	16.3 (61.3)	19.1 (66.4)	23.4 (74.1)	27.9 (82.2)	31.0 (87.8)	30.8 (87.4)	25.9 (78.6)	21.0 (69.8)	15.4 (59.7)	12.2 (54.0)	20.6 (69.1)
Daily mean °C (°F)	6.7 (44.1)	7.2 (45.0)	10.3 (50.5)	13.1 (55.6)	17.2 (63.0)	21.3 (70.3)	24.0 (75.2)	23.8 (74.8)	19.6 (67.3)	15.7 (60.3)	10.5 (50.9)	7.3 (45.1)	14.7 (58.5)
Mean daily minimum °C (°F)	1.6 (34.9)	1.5 (34.7)	4.3 (39.7)	7.1 (44.8)	11.0 (51.8)	14.7 (58.5)	17.0 (62.6)	16.8 (62.2)	13.4 (56.1)	10.3 (50.5)	5.5 (41.9)	2.4 (36.3)	8.8 (47.8)
Record low °C (°F)	−16.6 (2.1)	−20.2 (−4.4)	−12.5 (9.5)	−4 (25)	−1.1 (30.0)	3.2 (37.8)	6.0 (42.8)	4.0 (39.2)	1.7 (35.1)	−4.7 (23.5)	−9 (16)	−14.9 (5.2)	−20.2 (−4.4)
Average precipitation mm (inches)	52.8 (2.08)	35.9 (1.41)	33.2 (1.31)	58.4 (2.30)	47.5 (1.87)	36.4 (1.43)	15.9 (0.63)	33.8 (1.33)	88.2 (3.47)	77.1 (3.04)	78.6 (3.09)	51.0 (2.01)	608.8 (23.97)
Average precipitation days (≥ 1.0 mm)	5.5	4.6	4.8	6.5	5.3	3.4	2.0	2.8	5.2	6.0	7.5	5.2	58.9
Mean monthly sunshine hours	150.8	176.7	233.4	244.3	296.6	330.7	370.0	331.6	256.5	189.5	152.4	140.9	2,873.2
Source: Météo France

== Sights ==
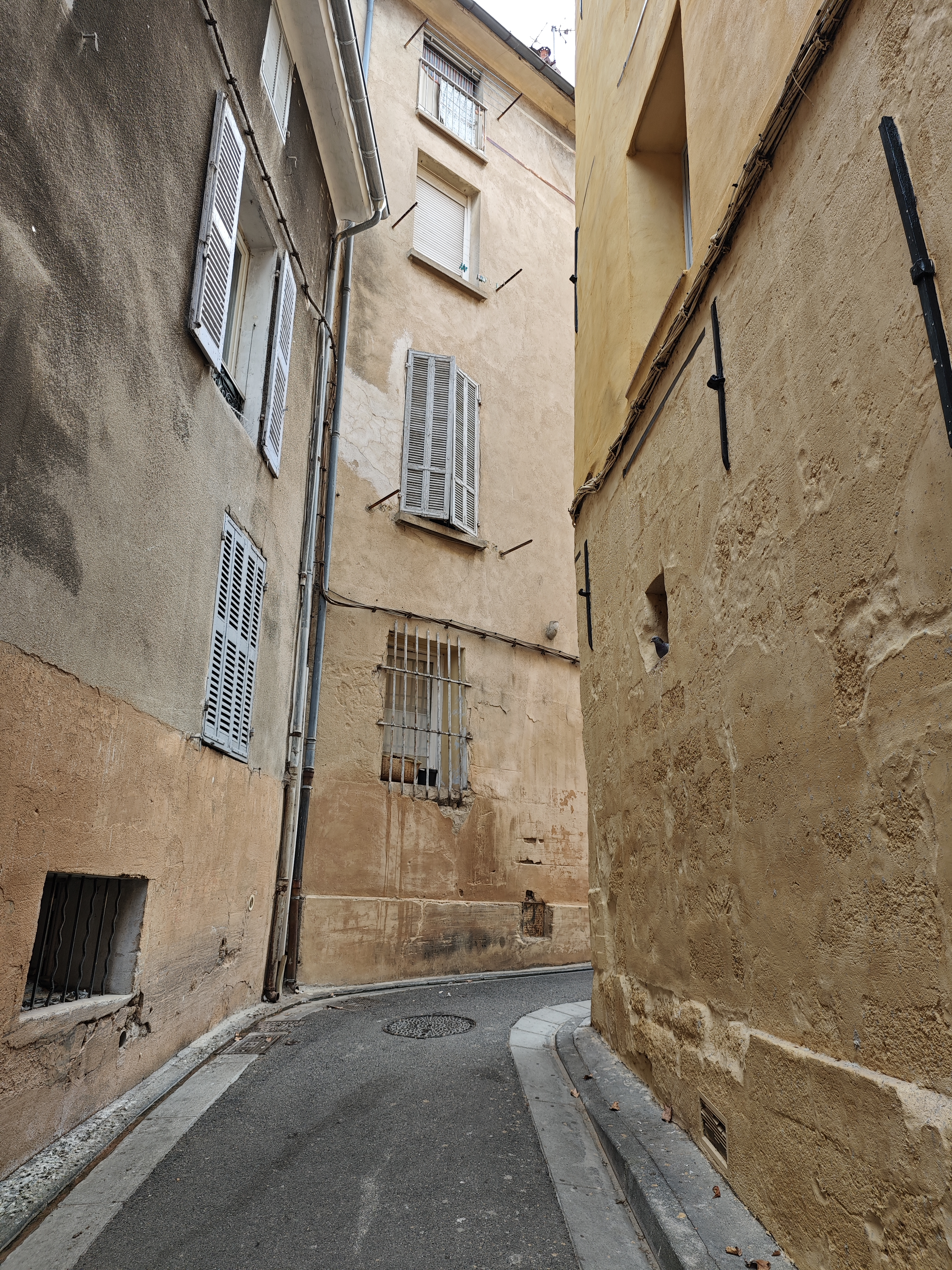
The narrow streets of Aix

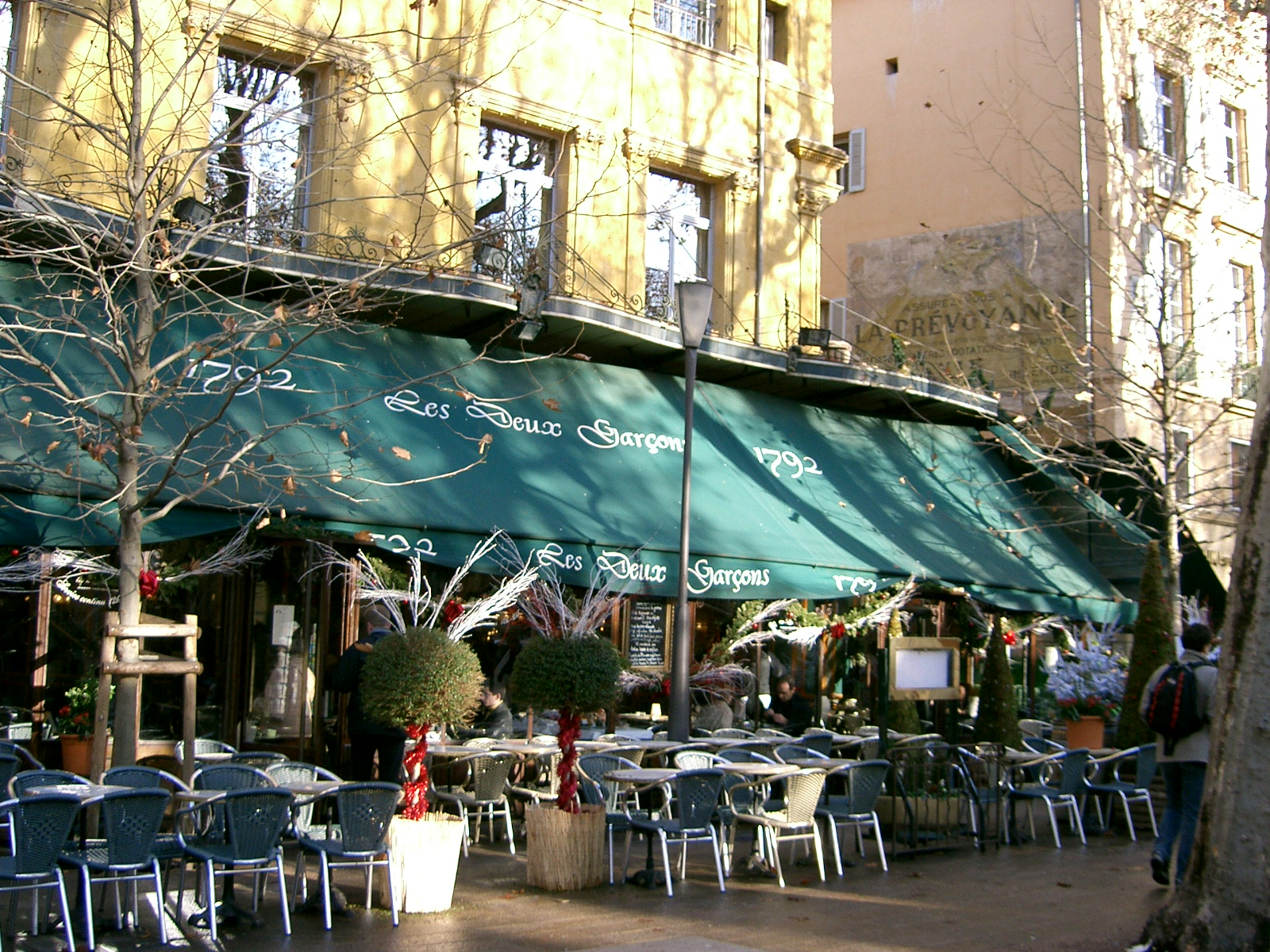
Les Deux Garçons

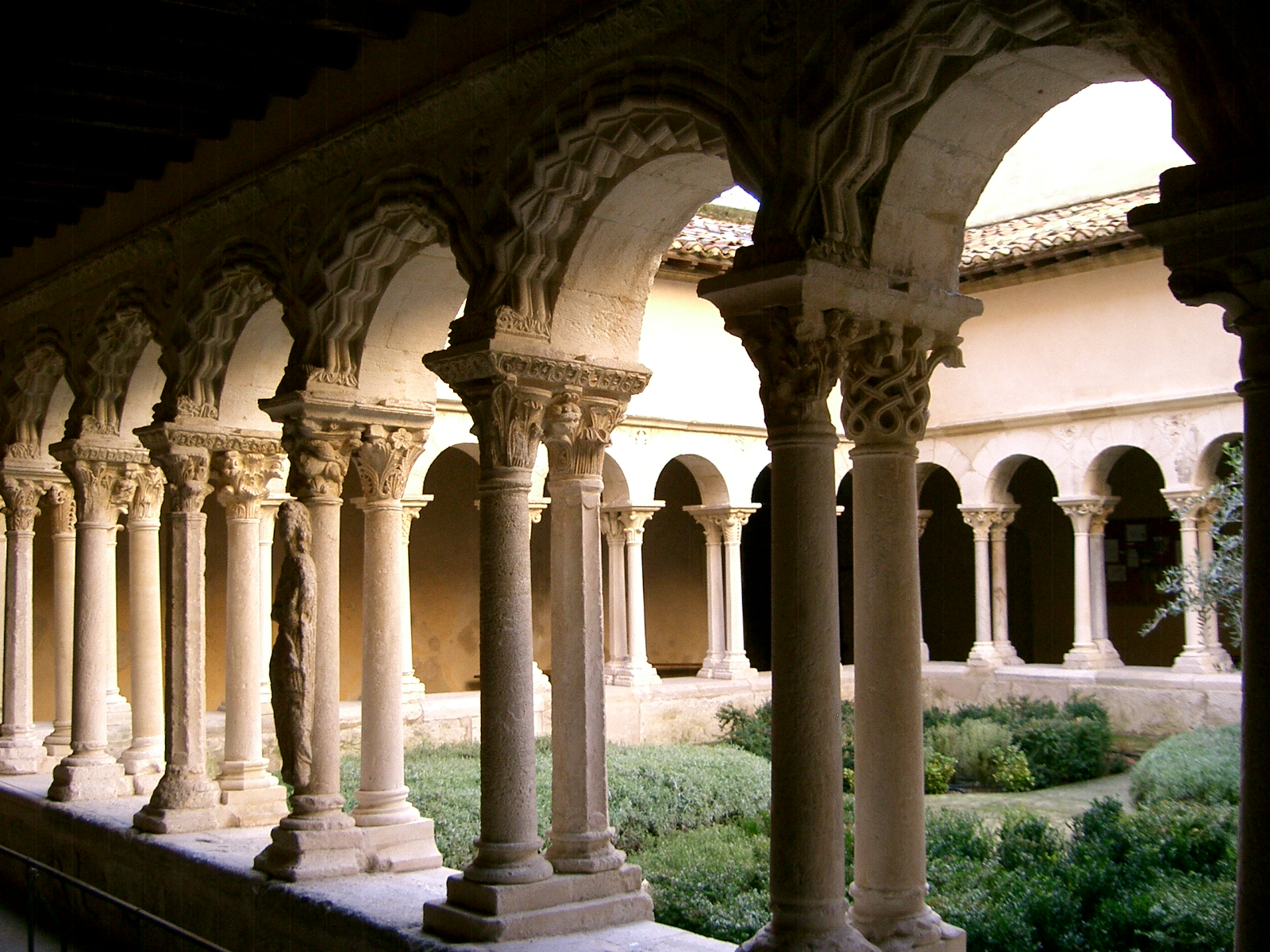
The Cathedral Cloisters

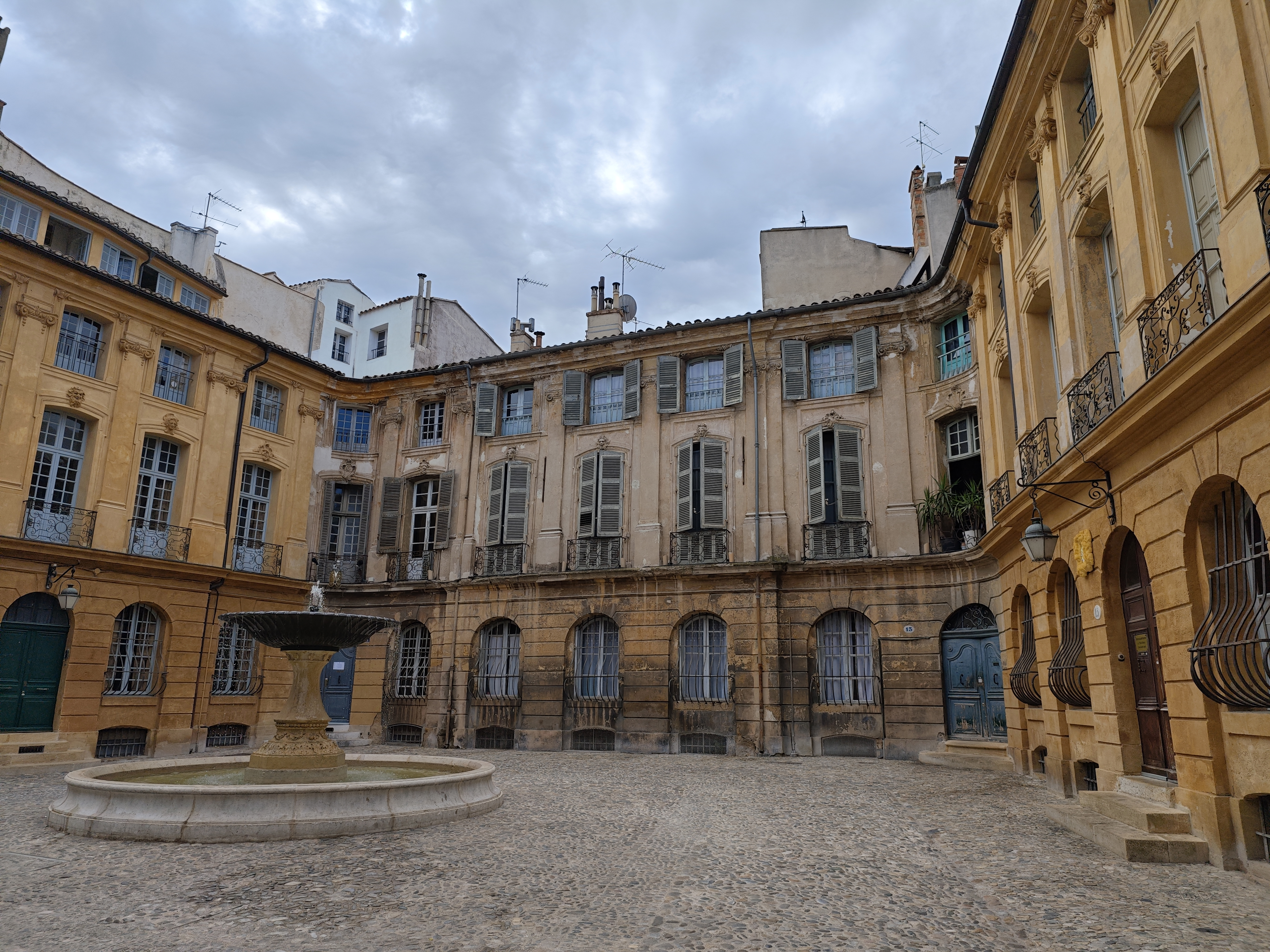
Cobbled square with shuttered historic façades and a central fountain in the old town of Aix-en-Provence.

The Cours Mirabeau is a wide thoroughfare, planted with double rows of plane trees, bordered by fine houses and decorated by fountains. It follows the line of the old city wall, and divides the town into two sections. The new town extends to the south and west; the old town, with its narrow, irregular streets, and its old mansions dating from the 16th, 17th and 18th centuries, lies to the north. Situated on this avenue, which is lined on one side with banks and on the other with cafés, is the Deux Garçons, the most famous brasserie in Aix. Built in 1792, it was frequented by the likes of Paul Cézanne, Émile Zola and Ernest Hemingway. On 3 November 2019, Les Deux Garçons was devastated by a fire that engulfed the entire building, leaving the much loved establishment just a shell.

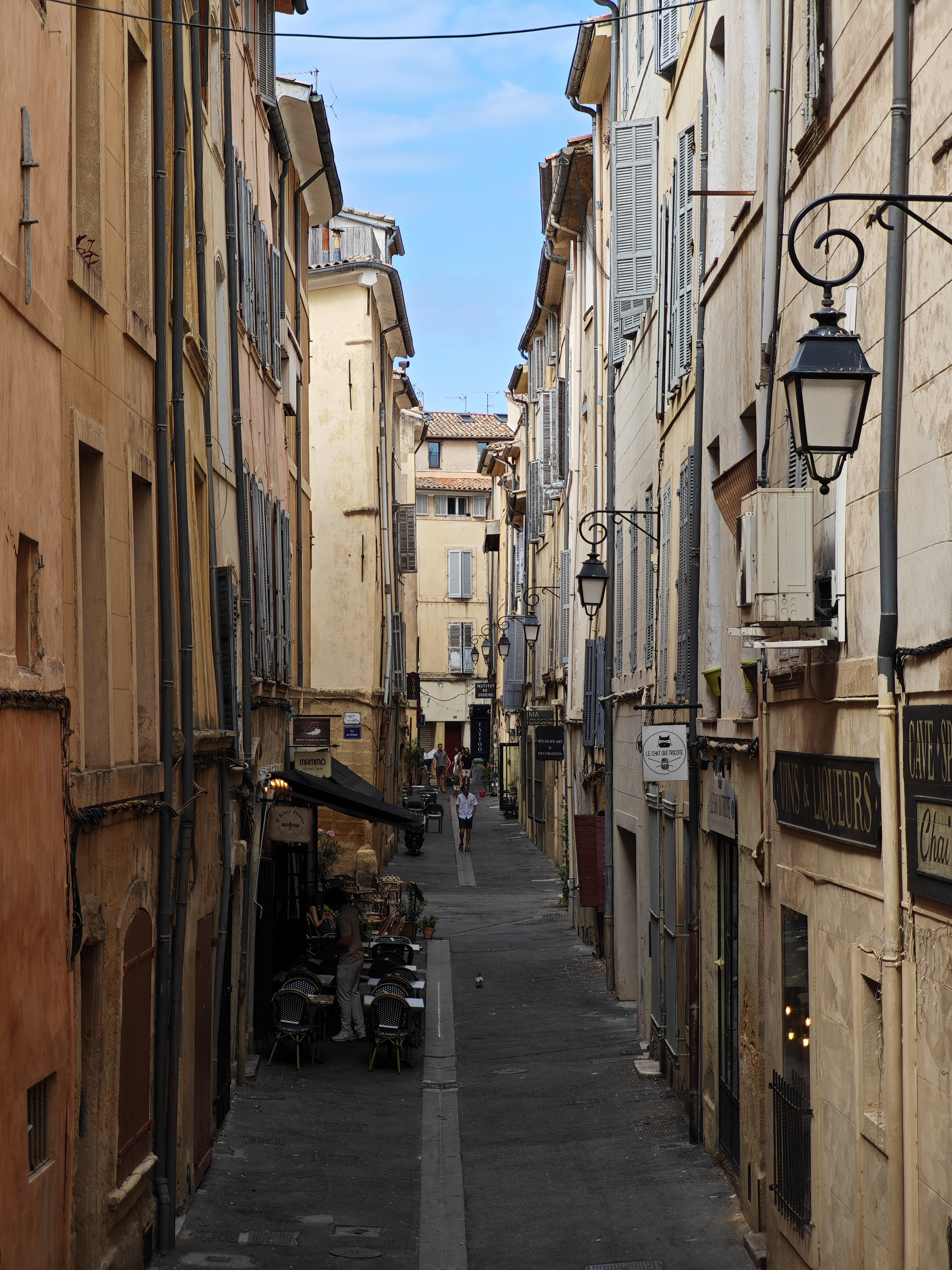
Narrow streets in Aix-en-Provence

The Cathedral of the Holy Saviour (Aix Cathedral) is situated to the north in the medieval part of Aix. Built on the site of a former Roman forum and an adjacent basilica, it contains a mixture of all styles from the 5th to the 17th century, including a richly decorated portal in the Gothic style with doors elaborately carved in walnut. The interior contains 16th-century tapestries, a 15th-century triptych depicting King René and his wife on the side panels, as well as a Merovingian baptistery, its Renaissance dome supported by original Roman columns. The archbishop's palace (Palais de l'Archêveché) and a Romanesque cloister adjoin the cathedral on its south side. The Archbishopric of Aix is now shared with Arles.

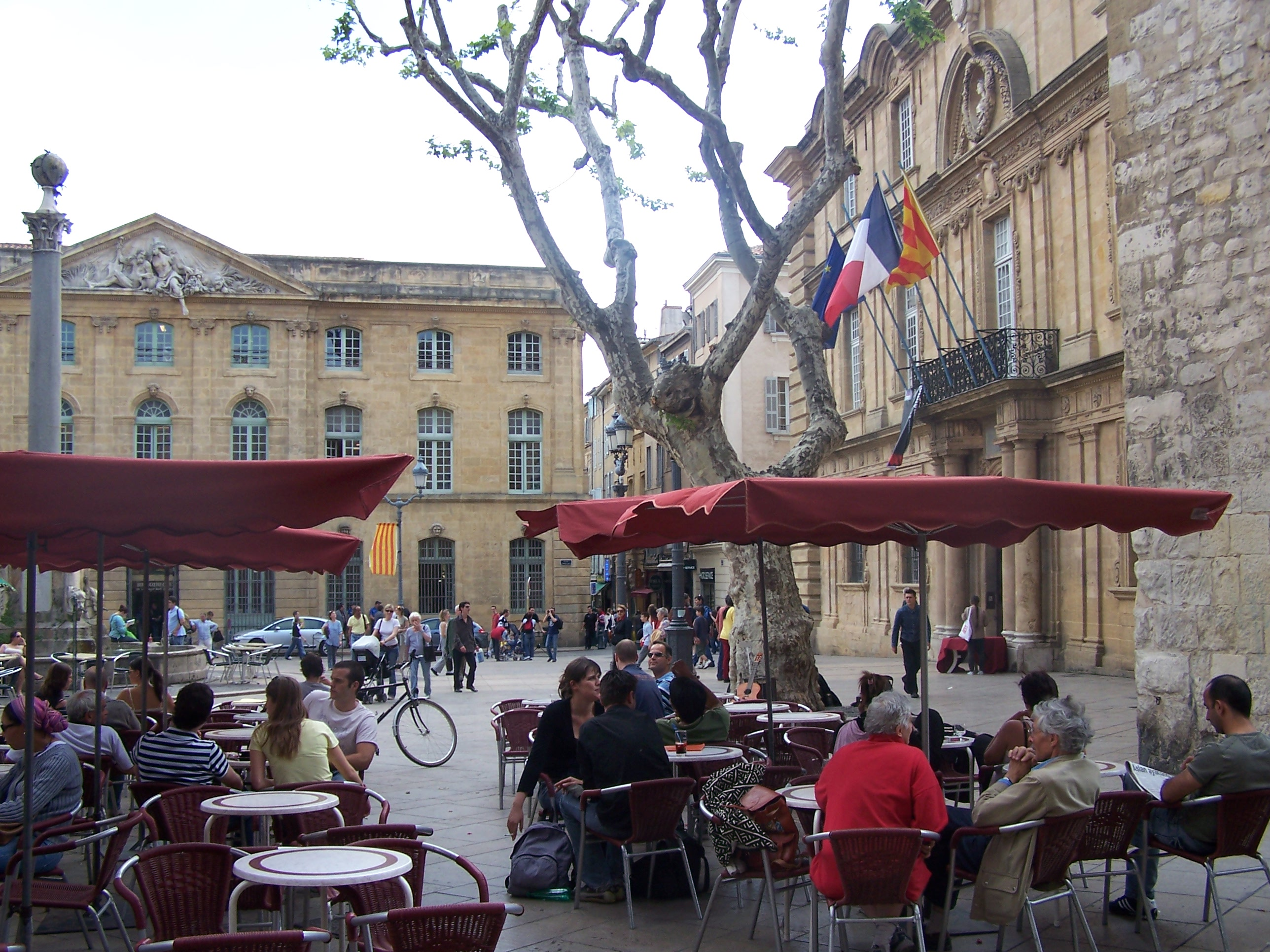
Place de l'Hôtel de Ville with the Hôtel de Ville on the right

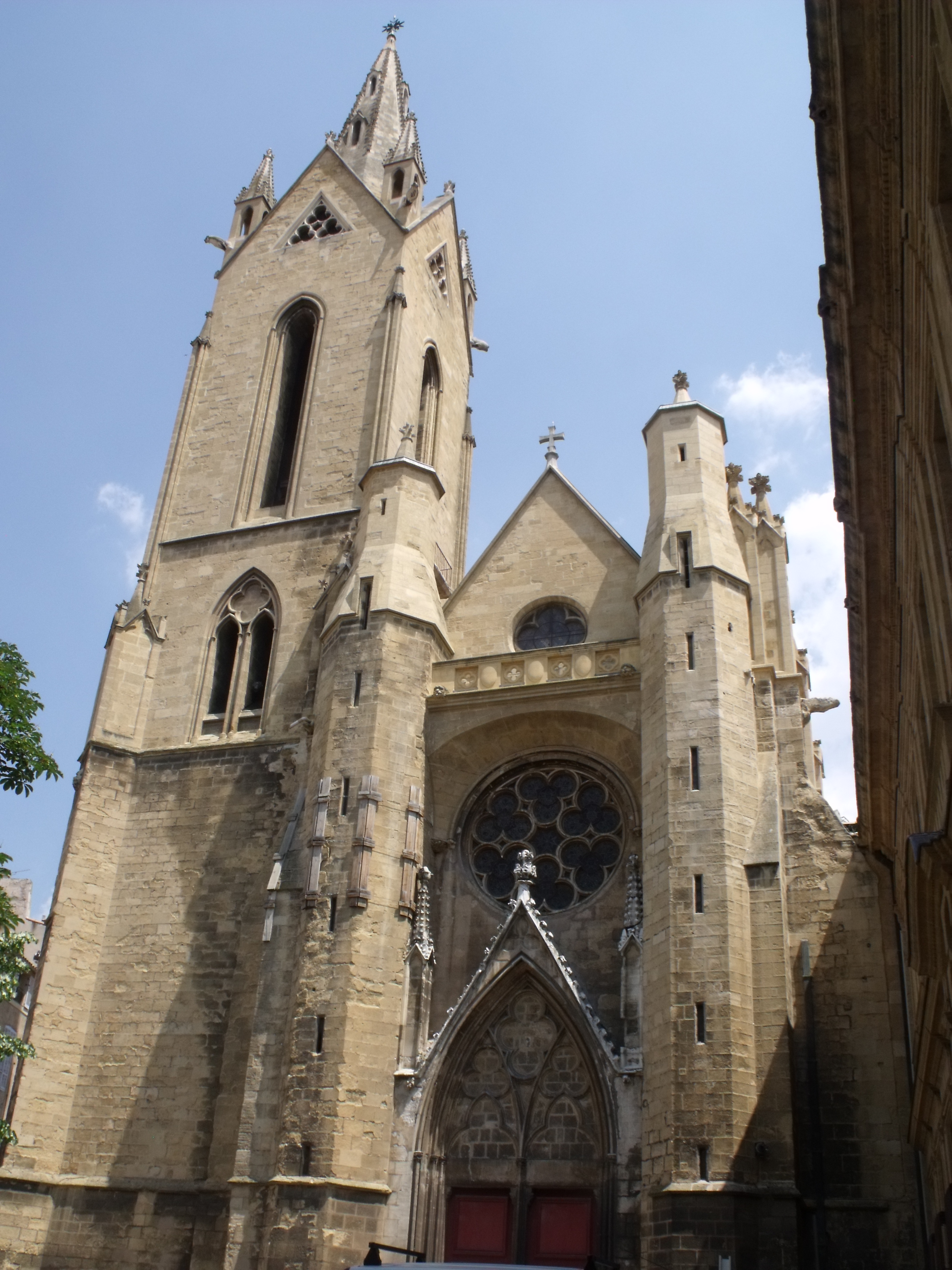
Saint-Jean-de-Malte

Among its other public institutions, Aix also has the second most important Appeal Court (Palais de Justice) outside of Paris, located near the site of the former Palace of the Counts (Palais des Comtes) of Provence.

The Hôtel de Ville (town hall), a building in the classical style of the middle of the 17th century, looks onto a picturesque square (Place de l'Hôtel de Ville). It contains some fine woodwork and tapestries. At its side rises a handsome clock-tower, erected in 1510. Also on the Place de l'Hôtel de Ville is the former Corn Exchange (1759–1761) (Halle de Grains). This ornately decorated 18th-century building was designed by the Vallon brothers. Nearby are the remarkable thermal springs, containing lime and carbonic acid, that first drew the Romans to Aix and gave it the name Aquae Sextiae. A spa was built in 1705 near the remains of the ancient Roman baths of Sextius.

South of the Cours Mirabeau is the Quartier Mazarin. This residential district was constructed for the gentry of Aix by Archbishop Michele Mazzarino brother of Cardinal Jules Mazarin in the last half of the 17th century and contains several notable hôtels particuliers. The 13th-century church of Saint-Jean-de-Malte contains valuable pictures and a recently restored organ. Next to it is the Musée Granet, devoted to European painting and sculpture.

Aix is often referred to as the city of a thousand fountains. Among the most notable are the 17th-century Fontaine des Quatre Dauphins (Fountain of the Four Dolphins) in the Quartier Mazarin, designed by Jean-Claude Rambot, and three of the fountains down the central Cours Mirabeau: at the top, a 19th-century fountain depicts the "good king" René holding the Muscat grapes that he introduced to Provence in the 15th century; halfway down is a natural hot water fountain (34 °C), covered in moss, dating back to the Romans; and at the bottom, at la Rotonde, the hub of modern Aix, stands a monumental fountain from 1860 beneath three giant statues representing art, justice and agriculture. In the older part of Aix, there are also fountains of note in the Place d'Albertas and the Place des Trois-Ormeaux.

Aix is the birthplace of Post-Impressionist painter Paul Cézanne. A walking trail links sites including his childhood home, Jas de Bouffan, and his former studio, Atelier Cézanne. The white limestone mountain Sainte-Victoire overlooks the city and was a frequent subject of Cézanne's works.

== Education ==
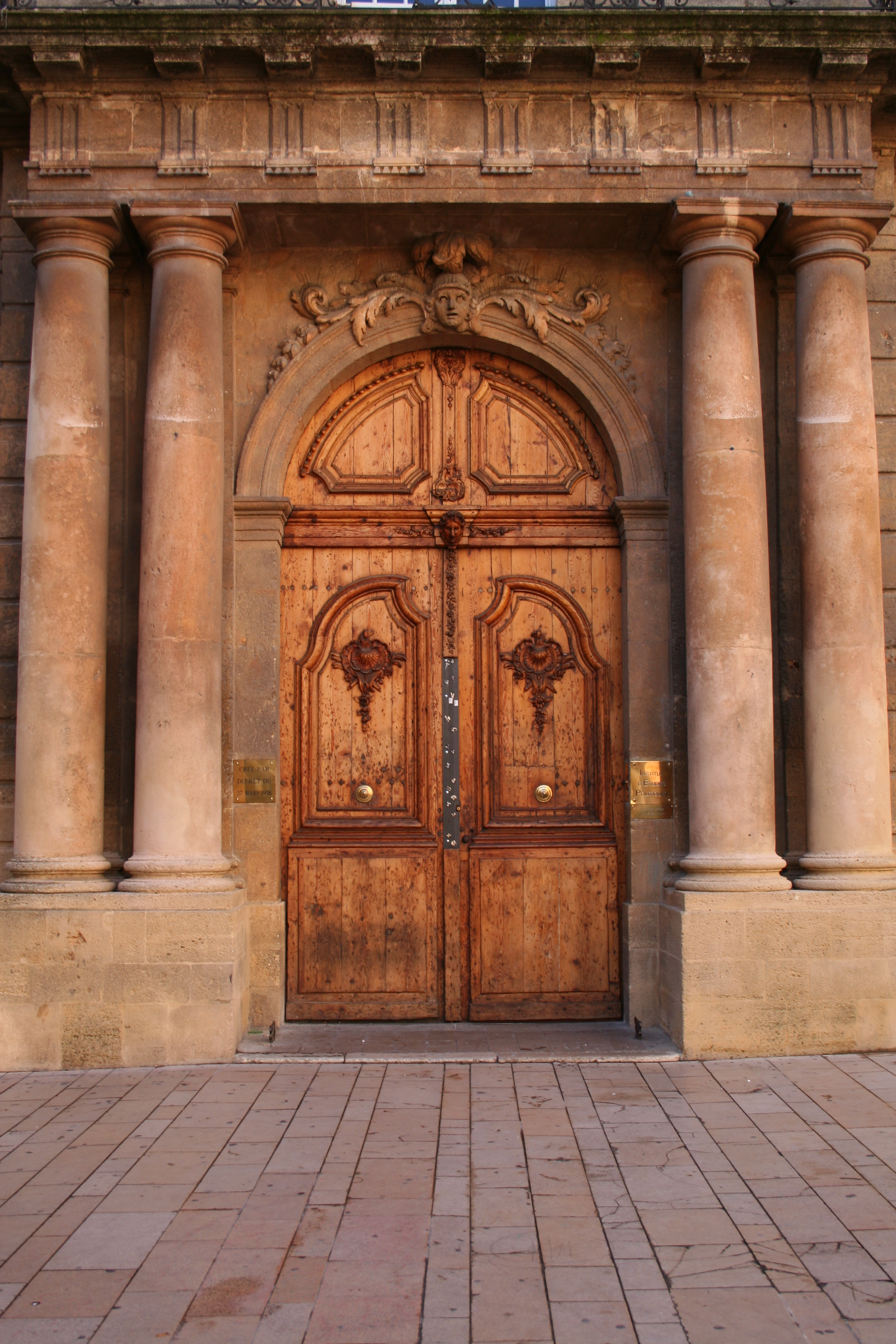
The Institute of Political Studies (Sciences Po)

Aix has long been a university town: Louis II of Anjou granted a royal charter for a university in 1409. Today Aix-en-Provence remains an important educational centre, with many teaching and research institutes:

- Arts et Métiers ParisTech, an engineering graduate school that settled a campus in the city in 1843. This teaching and research center (CER) let the students attend courses focused on industrial and mechanical engineering.
- Aix-Marseille University, consisting of the faculty and former campuses of:
  - University of Provence Aix-Marseille I, specialising in the humanities.
  - Université de la Méditerranée Aix-Marseille II, specialising in economics.
  - Université Paul Cézanne Aix-Marseille III, specialising principally in law, economics, political science and administration.
- Institut d'études politiques d'Aix-en-Provence (IEP) is part of France's network of political studies universities, often referred to as "Sciences Po".
- Institut de l'Aménagement Régional, an institute in the Université Paul Cézanne for town and country planning.
- The American College of the Mediterranean (ACM), an American-style degree-granting institution with programs in art, art history, business, communication, French language and culture, international relations, psychology and many others. ACM also includes a study abroad institute for undergraduates, IAU College.

Aix also has several training collèges, lycées, and a college of art and design. It has also become a centre for many international study programmes. Several lycées offer CPGE.

== Culture ==
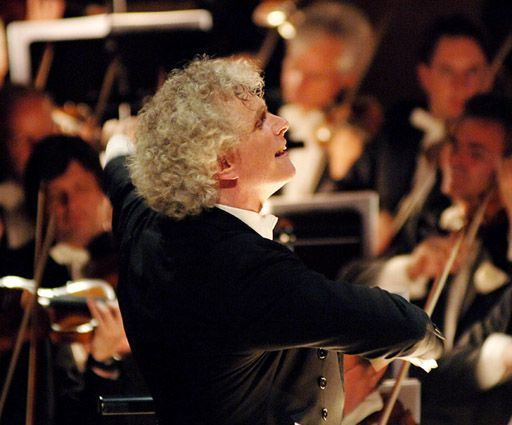
Sir Simon Rattle conducting Das Rheingold in 2006

=== Music ===
Aix holds two significant musical events each year. These are:

==== Festival d'Aix-en-Provence ====
An important opera festival, the Festival international d'Art Lyrique, founded in 1948, now ranks with those in Bayreuth, Salzburg and Glyndebourne. The director until 2018 was Bernard Foccroulle, organist and director of la Monnaie in Brussels. The festival takes place in late June and July each year. The main venues in Aix itself are the outdoor Théâtre de l'Archévêché in the former garden of the archbishop's palace, the recently restored 18th-century Théâtre du Jeu de Paume, and the newly built Grand Théâtre de Provence; operas are also staged in the outdoor Théâtre du Grand Saint-Jean outside Aix. Linked to the festival is the Académie européenne de musique, a summer school for young musicians with master classes by celebrated artists. Over the four-year period from 2006 until 2009, Sir Simon Rattle's version of Wagner's Ring Cycle with the Berlin Philharmonic was performed at the Aix festival. The current director of the festival is Ted Huffman, who succeeded Pierre Audi.

==== Musique dans la Rue ====
This takes place each year in June to coincide with the national 'Fête de la Musique.' There is a week of classical, jazz, and popular concerts held in different street venues and courtyards in the city. Some of these events are held in the Conservatoire Darius Milhaud, named in honour of the French composer, a native of Aix.

=== Dance ===
The dance company Ballet Preljocaj of the French dancer and choreographer Angelin Preljocaj has been located in Aix since 1996. In 2007 it took up residence in the Pavillon Noir, a centre for dance performance, designed in 1999 by the architect Rudy Ricciotti. The centre is one of nineteen of its kind in France, designated Centre chorégraphique national.

=== European Capital of Culture ===
Aix-en-Provence was part of Marseille-Provence 2013, the year-long cultural festival when the region served as the European Capital of Culture. Aix hosted several major cultural events including one half of the Grand Atelier du Midi gala exhibition and an episode of the Révélations pyrotechnical performance. The city also unveiled major new cultural infrastructure to coincide with Marseille-Provence 2013, including the Darius Milhaud Conservatory designed by Kengo Kuma.

=== Museums and libraries ===
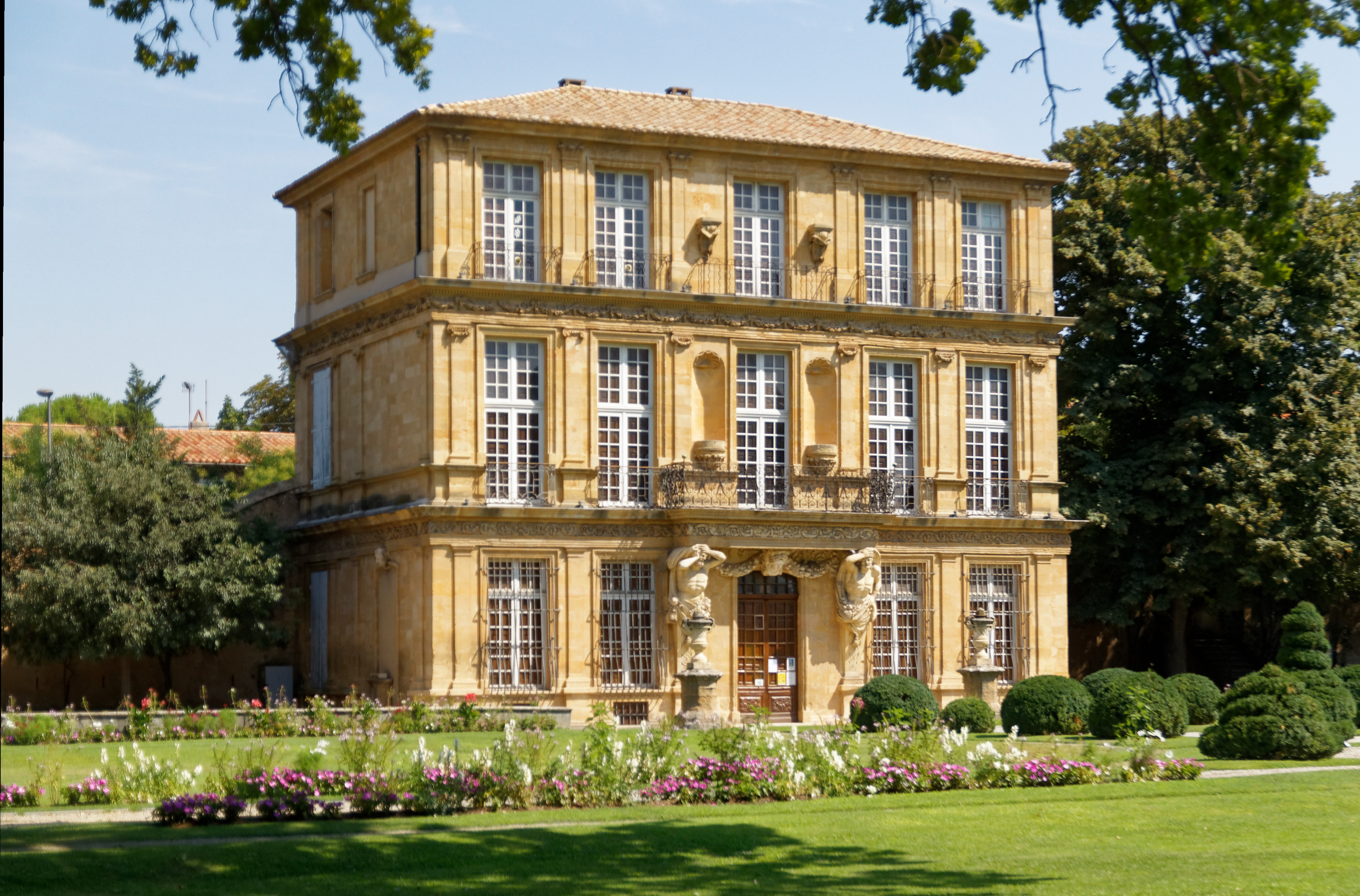
Vendôme Pavilion

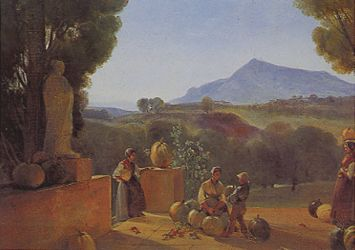
Granet's "Pumpkin Harvest" at the Musée Granet

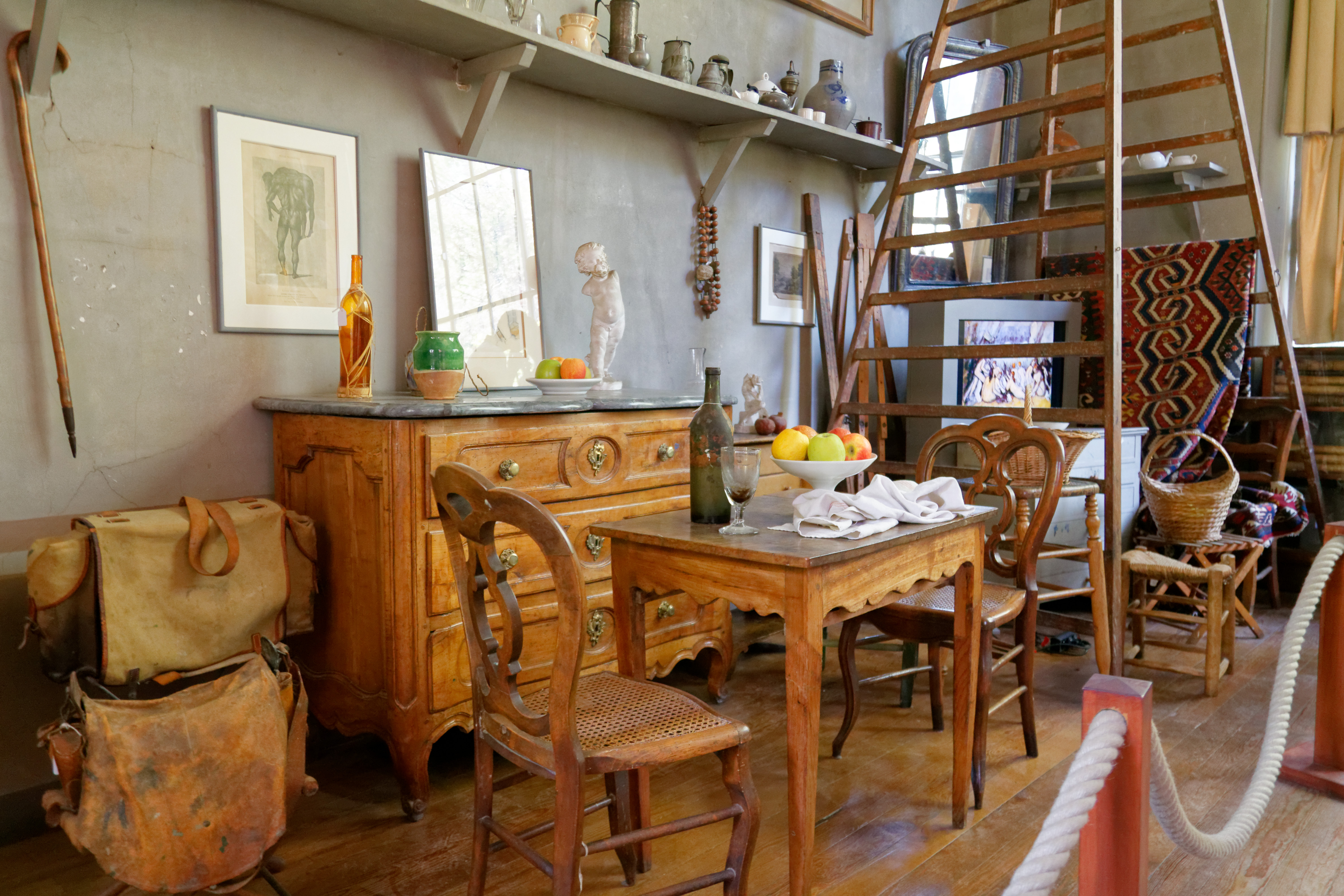
Paul Cézanne's studio from 1902 until his 1906 death

Aix has several museums and galleries:

- Le Musée du Vieil Aix (Museum of Old Aix), housed in two period hôtels particuliers and devoted to the history and provencal heritage of Aix.
- Le Muséum d’Histoire Naturelle (Natural History Museum).
- Le Musée de Tapisseries (Tapestry Museum), housed in the Archbishop's Palace and with a collection of tapestries and furniture from the 17th and 18th centuries.
- Le Musée Paul Arbaud (Faïence/Pottery).
- Le Musée Granet, a museum devoted to painting, sculpture and the archeology of Aix. It recently underwent significant restoration and reorganization, prior to the international exhibition in 2006 marking the centenary of Cézanne's death. Due to lack of space, the large archeological collection, including many recent discoveries, will be displayed in a new museum, still in the planning stages. The museum contains major paintings by Jean-Dominique Ingres (among which the monumental Jupiter and Thetis), an authentic self-portrait by Rembrandt, and works by Anthony van Dyck, Paul Cézanne, Alberto Giacometti and Nicolas de Staël. In June 2011, the first part of the collection of the Fondation Jean et Suzanne Planque opened at the Musée Granet, containing over 180 artworks. This legacy of the Swiss painter, dealer and art collector Jean Planque, a personal friend of Pablo Picasso, has been donated to the city for an initial period of 15 years. The collection contains over 300 works of art, including paintings and drawings by Degas, Renoir. Gauguin, Monet, Cézanne, Van Gogh, Picasso, Pierre Bonnard, Paul Klee, Fernand Léger, Giacometti and Dubuffet. The full collection will be housed in a specially constructed annex in the Chapelle des Pénitents Blancs, situated nearby: the expected opening is in 2013.
- Le Pavillon de Vendôme, a 17th-century mansion housing permanent and touring art exhibitions.
- The Fondation Vasarely, a gallery dedicated to the works of the Hungarian-born French abstract painter Victor Vasarely.
- Le Camp des Milles
- L'atelier Cézanne, the former studio of Paul Cézanne, now a museum, located in the northern outskirts of Aix. It has been preserved as it was at the time of the painter's death and contains many of his personal items and props used in his paintings.
- Jas de Bouffan, the house and grounds of Cézanne's father, now partially open to the public.

Prior to 1989 Aix had several libraries, for example in the Parc Jourdan and the Town Hall. In 1989, many of these were moved to the Méjanes, an old match factory.

In 1993, the "Cité du Livre" was opened around the library. This has media spaces for dance, cinema and music, and a training facility for librarians. Adjacent to the Cité du Livre are the Grand Théâtre de Provence and the Pavillon Noir (see above).

=== Montagne Sainte-Victoire ===
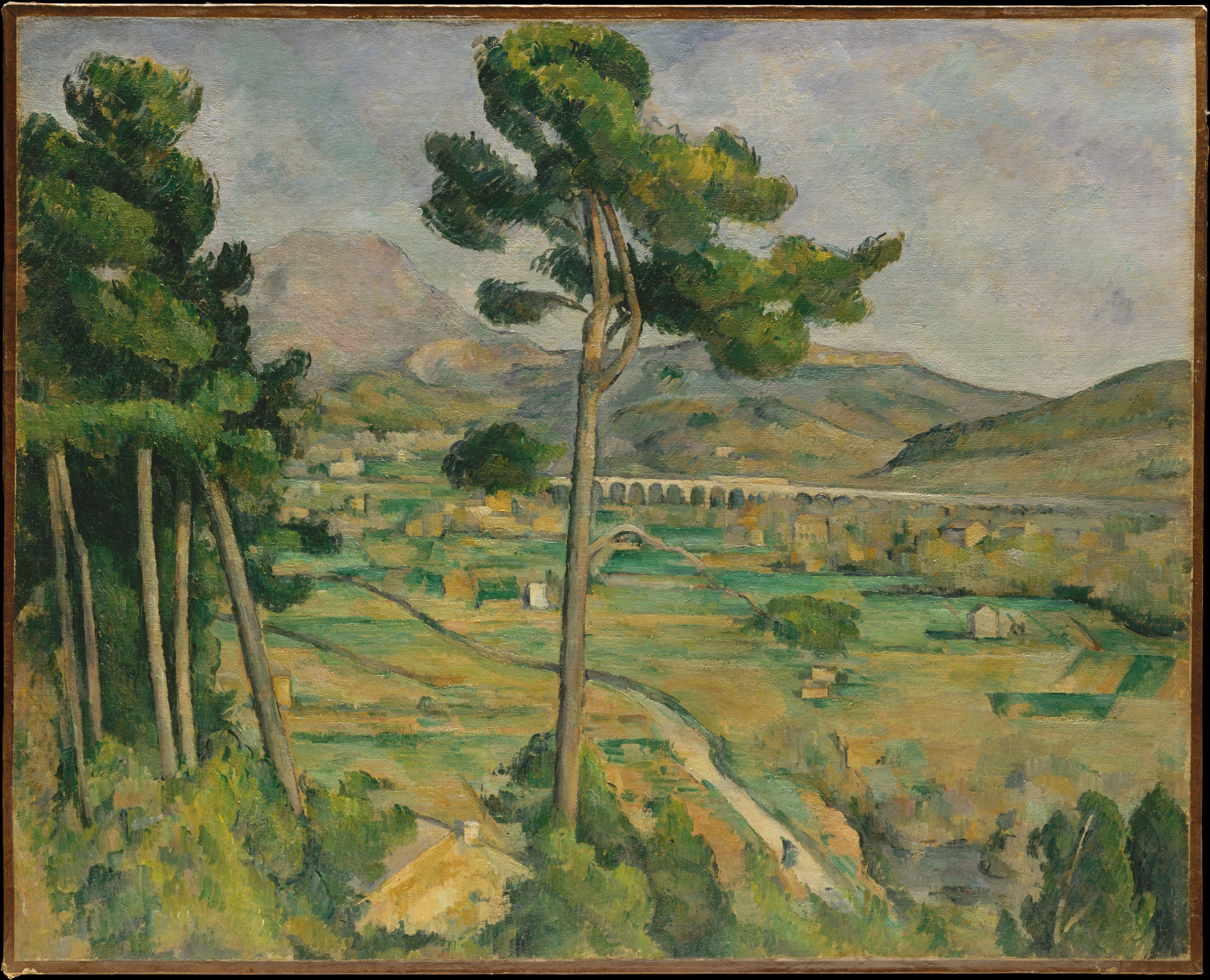
Mont Sainte-Victoire and the Viaduct of the Arc River Valley, Paul Cézanne, 1882–1885

Mont Sainte-Victoire, Paul Cézanne, 1904–1906

To the east of Aix rises Montagne Sainte-Victoire (1,011 metres or 3,317 feet), one of the landmarks of the Pays d'Aix. It is accessible from the centre of Aix by road or on foot, taking the wooded footpath of Escrachou Pevou to the plateau of Bibemus. It dramatically overshadows the small dam built by Émile Zola's father and was a favourite subject and haunt of Paul Cézanne throughout his lifetime. In the village of Le Tholonet on the precipitous southern side of Mont Sainte-Victoire, there is a windmill that he used, and beyond that a mountain hut, the refuge Cézanne, where he liked to paint.

To the north, the mountain slopes gently down through woodland to the village of Vauvenargues. The Château of Vauvenargues overlooking the village was formerly occupied by the counts of Provence (including René of Anjou) and the Archbishops of Aix before it became the family home of the marquis de Vauvenargues. It was acquired by the Spanish artist Pablo Picasso in 1958, who was resident there from 1959 until 1962, when he moved to Mougins. He and his wife Jacqueline are buried in its grounds, which are not usually open to the public.

Mont Sainte-Victoire has a complex network of paths, leading to the priory and Croix de Provence at the summit, to the large man-made reservoir of Bimont and to the Roman viaduct above le Tholonet.

== Sport ==
- Association football is represented in the city by AS Aix-en-Provence. Their best result was playing in French Division 1 in the 1967–68 season, but recent years see the team playing in amateur levels of the French football league system.
- Rugby union club Provence Rugby (previously known as Aix Rugby Club and Pays d'Aix Rugby Club) is based in the city. As of 2021, they play in Rugby Pro D2, the second-tier French league.
- Pays d'Aix Université Club Handball is a handball club competing in the top-level French First League of Handball.
- American football team Les Argonautes Aix-en-Provence has won the top-level Ligue Élite de Football Américain a total of eight times and is one of the most successful teams in the country. They were finalist of the 1996 Eurobowl.
- The city hosts a professional tennis tournament on the ATP Challenger Tour. It is held every May at the Country Club Aixois.
- Former world number one squash player Grégory Gaultier lives in Aix-en-Provence.
- The city hosted Ukraine's football base camp during Euro 2016.
- The city holds a junior fencing World Cup event for men's foil in January of each year. Local fencer Erwann Le Péchoux was part of the team that won the gold medal in men's team foil at the 2020 Summer Olympics.

== Economy ==
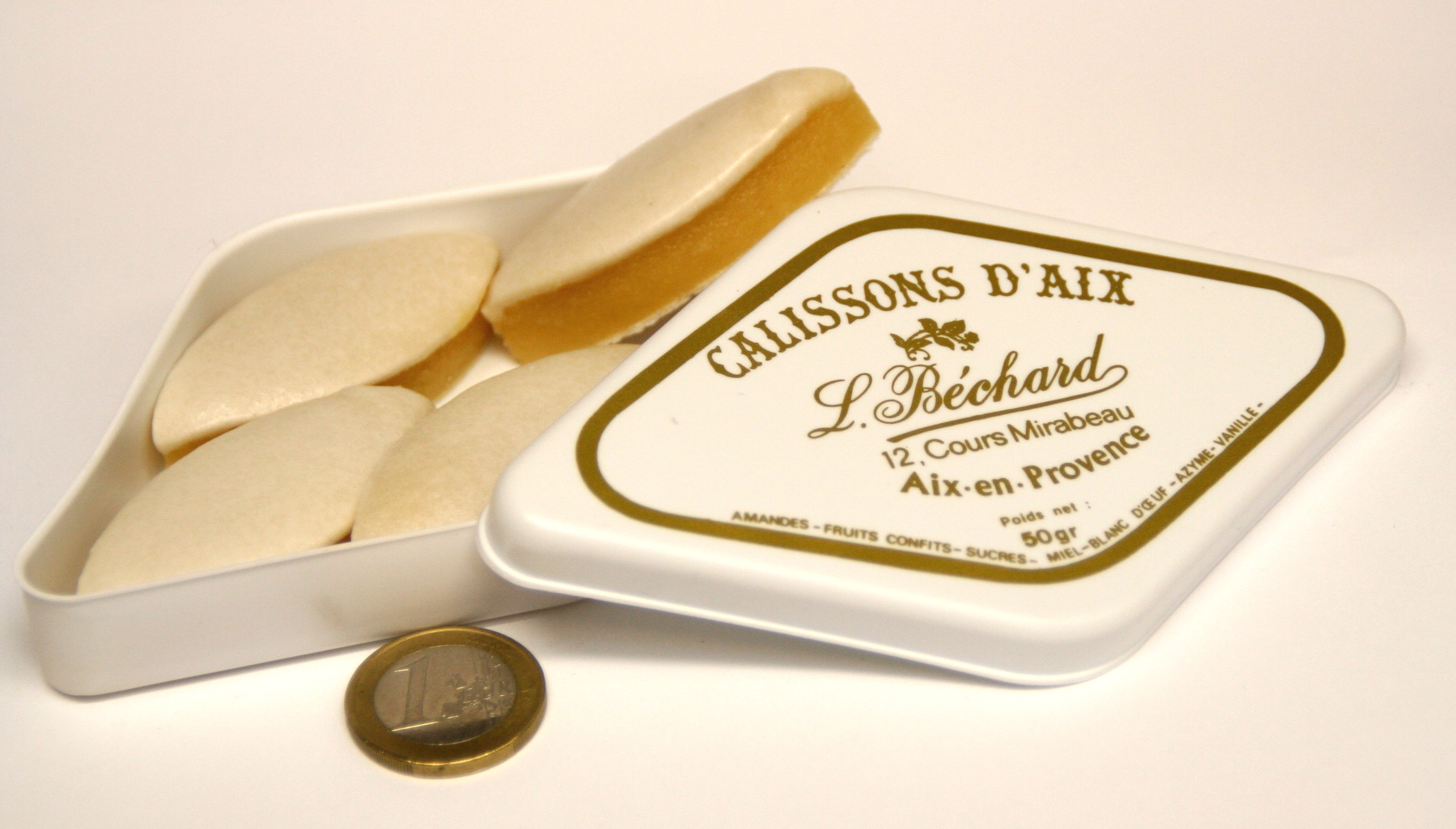
Calissons, a specialty of Aix-en-Provence

Industries formerly included flour-milling, the manufacture of confectionery, iron-ware, hats, matches and the extraction of olive oil.

Current economic activities include:

- Tourism.
- Entertainment, particularly opera and dance.
- The semiconductor and electronics industry in Rousset, to the south of Mont Ste.-Victoire, specializing in microchip technology for credit cards.
- Education and research. In Aix the University of Aix-Marseille specializes in the humanities, law and economics.
- The computer software industry.
- The manufacture of santons, traditional hand-crafted figurines, often associated with provencal Christmas creches.
- The manufacture of olive oil.
- The manufacture of calissons, a lozenge-shaped confection made from almonds, orange peel, sugar, and crystallized melon. Each year in early September, there is a mass in French and Provençal in the medieval church of St Jean de Malte to bless the calissons – la bénédiction des calissons. This ceremony has been held since the 17th century to mark the deliverance of Aix from the plague. It is currently accompanied by a colourful provencal pageant, involving most of the local calisson manufacturers and their wares. About calissons, Provençal novelist Marcel Pagnol wrote that, to make true calissons "'You need one-third almonds, one-third fruit confits, one-third sugar, and a quarter savoir faire.''
- Viticulture: the local Appellation d'Origine Contrôlée is Coteaux d'Aix-en-Provence AOC, with many vineyards between Aix and the River Durance to the north. The reputed appellation of Palette AOC is represented by the estates of Château Simone in Meyreuil and Château Crémade in Le Tholonet, to the east of Aix. There is a fair of local wine producers every year on the last Sunday in July on the Cours Mirabeau. Grape varieties include grenache, syrah, cabernet sauvignon, and notably vermentino.
- Chocolate: the well known Chocolaterie de Puyricard is situated in the hills to the north of Aix.
- Saffron: The Safranière de Provence is an organic saffron producer situated near Aix-en-Provence.

The airline Twin Jet has its head office in Aix-en-Provence.

From 1990 to 2000, criminal organizations established complex extortion rings in Marseille extending to Aix-en-Provence and the greater French Riviera. Since 2002, Le Milieu is known for, in addition to its extortion rings, large counterfeiting and white-collar crime operations. Due to increased financial regulation, Le Milieu has collectively pushed to integrate their crime profits into the legal economy.

== Demographics ==
Historical population

Year	Pop.	±% p.a.
1793	27,000	—
1800	21,009	−3.52%
1806	21,960	+0.74%
1821	22,412	+0.14%
1831	22,575	+0.07%
1836	24,660	+1.78%
1841	26,698	+1.60%
1846	27,280	+0.43%
1851	27,255	−0.02%
1856	26,136	−0.83%
1861	27,659	+1.14%
1866	28,152	+0.35%
1872	29,020	+0.51%
1876	28,693	−0.28%
1881	29,257	+0.39%
1886	29,057	−0.14%
1891	28,357	−0.49%
1896	28,913	+0.39%
1901	29,418	+0.35%

Year	Pop.	±% p.a.
1906	29,829	+0.28%
1911	29,836	+0.00%
1921	29,983	+0.05%
1926	35,106	+3.21%
1931	38,332	+1.77%
1936	42,615	+2.14%
1946	46,053	+0.78%
1954	54,217	+2.06%
1962	67,943	+2.86%
1968	89,566	+4.71%
1975	110,659	+3.07%
1982	121,327	+1.32%
1990	123,842	+0.26%
1999	133,018	+0.80%
2007	143,404	+0.94%
2012	141,148	−0.32%
2017	142,482	+0.19%
2023	149,695	+0.83%

Source: EHESS and INSEE (1968-2023)

== Politics ==
The current mayor of Aix-en-Provence is Sophie Joissains, elected on September 24, 2021.

List of successive mayors
term	Name	Party
2021–incumbent	Sophie Joissains	UDI
2001–2021	Maryse Joissains-Masini	LR
1989–2001	Jean-François Picheral	PS
1983–1989	Jean-Pierre de Peretti	UDF
1978–1983	Alain Joissains	UDF
1967–1978	Félix Ciccolini	PS
1945–1967	Henri Mouret	

Presidential Elections Second Round:

Election	Winning candidate	Party	%
2017	Emmanuel Macron	EM	73.59
2012	Nicolas Sarkozy	UMP	53.09
2007	Nicolas Sarkozy	UMP	57.30
2002	Jacques Chirac	RPR	80.74

== Transport ==
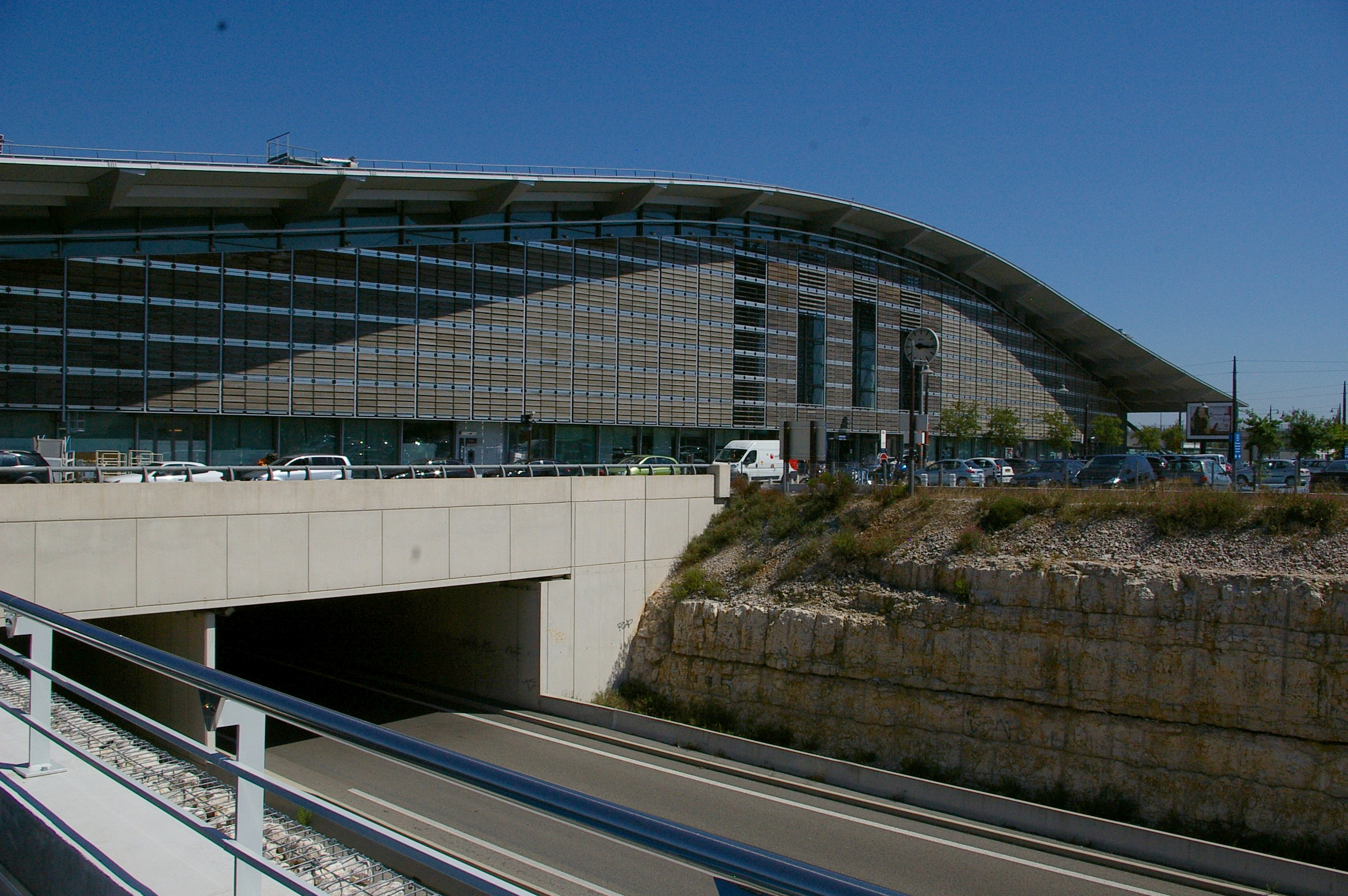
Aix-en-Provence TGV railway station.

A set of ancient roads radiate out from Aix to the surrounding countryside, the Pays d'Aix. There are also a large number of modern autoroutes connecting Aix to nearby towns. There are autoroutes northwards to Avignon and to the Luberon; southwards to Marseille; and eastwards to Aubagne and the Mediterranean coast of Provence; and to Nice and other towns on the French Riviera. Aix and Marseille are equidistant from the Marseille Provence Airport (MRS) at Marignane on the Étang de Berre which features domestic and international scheduled passenger service. There is another airport at Les Milles, which is mostly used by general aviation. There is a frequent bus shuttle service from the main bus station in Aix which also serves the nearby TGV station at l'Arbois, in the middle of the countryside about 16 kilometres (10 mi) from Aix.

At Aix, the line from Paris branches to Marseille and Nice; it takes about 3 hours to get from Paris to Aix by TGV. Aix also has a railway station near the centre, Gare d'Aix-en-Provence, with connections to Marseille, Pertuis and Briançon in the French Alps. A frequent and rapid shuttle bus service for commuters operates between the bus station in Aix and Marseille. There are many other long distance and local buses from the bus station. The city also offers a "city pass" available in 24, 48, and 72-hour packages for visiting tourists. The "pass tourisitque" is offered at the Aix-en-Provence Tourist Office, the Atelier de Cézanne, and the official Aix tourism website.

In the town itself, there is an inexpensive municipal bus service, including a dial-a-bus service ("proxibus"), a park-and-ride service and tiny electrified buses for those with mobility problems – these are six-seater vehicles that circulate at a speed of 16 km/h (10 mph). The central old town of Aix is for the most part pedestrianised. There are large underground and overground parking structures placed at regular intervals on the "boulevard extérieur", the predominantly one-way ring road that encircles the old town. Access to the old town is by a series of often narrow one-way streets, which can be confusing to navigate for the uninitiated.

As well as overland routes, two rivers flow through Aix, the Arc and the Torse, neither of which can be remotely described as navigable.

== Miscellaneous ==
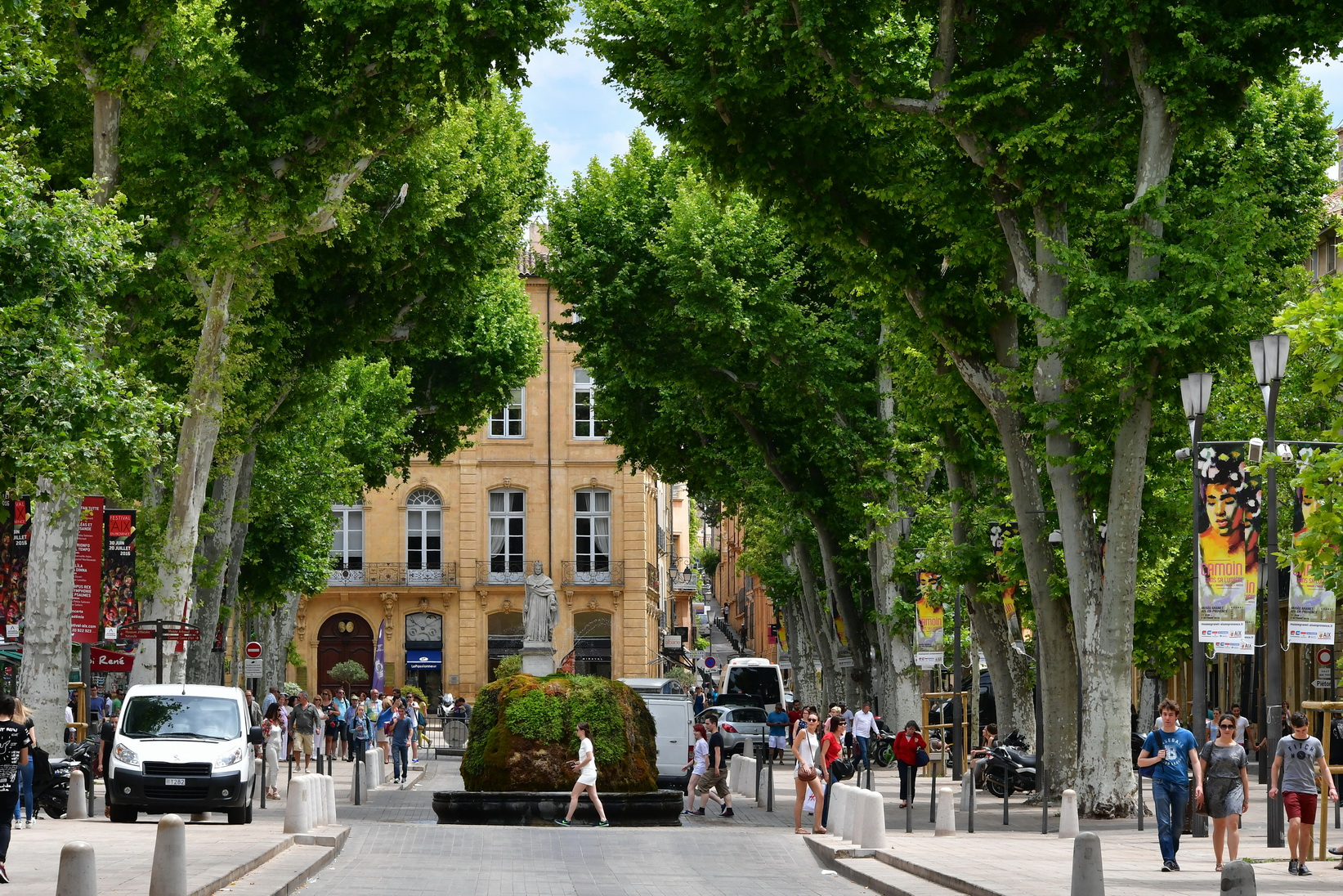
Cours Mirabeau

The local Aix dialect, rarely used and spoken by a rapidly decreasing number of people, is part of the Provençal dialect of the Occitan language. The Provençal for Aix-en-Provence is Ais de Prouvènço [ˈaj de pʀuˈvɛ̃sɔ]. Most of the older streets in Aix have names in both Provençal and French.

Aix hosted the ninth International Congress of Modern Architecture in 1953.

Aix is the home town of the rugby union team Provence Rugby. It played host to the All Blacks during the early stages of the 2007 Rugby World Cup.

Ysabel, the tenth novel of the best-selling Canadian author Guy Gavriel Kay, was set and written in Aix.

Italian electroacoustic artist Giuseppe Ielasi's album Aix was produced in Aix-en-Provence, hence the title.

This is also the site of an alleged sighting and landing of a UFO in 1981 that is taken seriously by GEIPAN, the department within the French Space Agency responsible for investigating aerospace phenomena.

== Twin towns – sister cities ==
Aix-en-Provence is twinned with:

Bath, England, United Kingdom (1977)
- Carthage, Tunisia (1993)
- Coimbra, Portugal (1982)
- Granada, Spain (1979)
- Perugia, Italy (1970)
- Tübingen, Germany (1960)

=== Friendship and cooperation ===
Aix-en-Provence also cooperates with:

- Baalbek, Lebanon (2003)
- Bamako, Mali (2003)
- Baton Rouge, United States (1999)
- Coral Gables, United States (1997)
- Kumamoto, Japan (2013)
- Oujda, Morocco (1998)
- Pécs, Hungary (2011)
- Philadelphia, United States (1998)
- Seattle, United States

== Notable people ==
- Eleanor of Provence (died 1291), queen consort of King Henry III of England
- Charles Annibal Fabrot (1580–1659), jurist
- David-Augustin de Brueys (1640–1723), theologian and playwright
- Joseph Pitton de Tournefort (1656–1708), botanist
- André Campra (1660–1744), composer and conductor
- Jean-Baptiste van Loo (1684–1745), painter
- Laurent Belissen (1693–1762), composer
- Joseph Lieutaud (1703–1780), doctor to Louis XV
- Luc de Clapiers, marquis de Vauvenargues (1715–1747), writer and moralist
- Joseph Sec (1715–1794), carpenter and architect
- Jean-François Pierre Peyron (1744–1814), painter
- Jean-Baptiste Giraud (1752–1830), sculptor
- Toussaint-Bernard Éméric-David (1755–1839), archeologist and arts writer
- Antoine Balthazar Joachim d'André (1759–1825), member of the National Constituent Assembly of 1789
- François Marius Granet (1775–1849), painter
- Charles-Joseph-Eugene de Mazenod (1782–1861), bishop of Marseille and founder of the Missionary Oblates of Mary Immaculate
- Eliza Courtney (1792–1859), illegitimate daughter of the Prime Minister Charles Grey, 2nd Earl Grey, and Georgiana Cavendish, Duchess of Devonshire
- François Mignet (1796–1884), historian
- François Vincent Latil (1796–1890), painter
- Achille Emperaire (1829–1898), painter
- François Vidal (1832–1911), Occitan poet and activist
- Paul Cézanne (1839–1906), painter
- Philippe Solari (1840–1906), sculptor
- Baptistin Baille (1841–1918), professor of optics and acoustics
- Maurice Rouvier (1842–1911), politician
- Alfred Capus (1858–1922), journalist and playwright
- Henri Brémond (1864–1933), theologian
- Armand Lunel (1892–1977), last known speaker of Shuadit
- Paul Veyne (1930–2022), historian and archeologist
- Jacques Pellegrin (1944–2021), painter
- Henri Michel (1947–2018), football player and coach
- Jean-Pierre Bréhier (born 1952), chef
- Didier Delsalle (born 1957), pilot
- Frédéric Fekkai (born 1958), celebrity hairstylist
- Tristan-Patrice Challulau (born 1959), classical composer
- Jean-Paul Delfino (born 1964), writer
- Julia Zemiro (born 1967), Australian television presenter and actress
- Hélène Grimaud (born 1969), concert pianist
- Franck Cammas (born 1972), yachtsman
- Marc Béziat (born 1975), music composer
- Arnaud Clément (born 1977), tennis player
- Célimène Daudet (born 1977), classical pianist
- Mylène Jampanoï (born 1980), actress
- Ouissem Belgacem (born 1988), former football player, writer
- Paris Laxmi (born 1991), Indian dancer

=== Notable residents ===
- Maximinus of Aix, saint, first bishop of Aix, who according to provencal tradition evangelised Aix with Mary Magdalene
- Saint Mitre (433–466), Christian martyr, died here and his relics are preserved in the Cathedral.
- René of Anjou (1409–1480), Duke of Anjou, Count of Provence
- Barthélemy d'Eyck (c. 1420 – after 1470), painter
- Nicolas-Claude Fabri de Peiresc (1580–1637), scientist best known for his correspondence
- Jean Daret (1613–1668), painter, died here.
- Pierre Joseph Garidel (1658–1737), botanist
- Claude Arnulphy (1697–1786), painter
- Jean-Baptiste Marie de Piquet, Marquis of Méjanes (1729–1786), who bequeathed to the town his collection of between 60 and 80 thousand books, which later became the municipal library, the Bibliothèque Méjanes
- Jean de Dieu-Raymond de Cucé de Boisgelin (1732–1804), Archbishop of Aix
- Victor d'Hupay (1746–1818), writer and philosopher
- Jean-Antoine Constantin (1756–1844), painter
- Antoine de L'Hoyer (1768–1852), composer, guitarist and soldier
- Ambroise Roux-Alphéran (1776–1858), clerk of court and historian
- Émile Zola (1840–1902), novelist, spent his childhood here.
- Joseph Ravaisou (1865–1925), painter, died here.
- Louise Germain (1874–1939), painter, died here.
- Joseph d'Arbaud (1874–1950), poet, died here.
- Darius Milhaud (1892–1984), composer and teacher
- Roland de Pury (1907–1979), Swiss minister, died here.
- M.F.K. Fisher (1908–1992), American author, wrote book about her stay in the city.
- Nina Simone (1933–2003), American singer, songwriter, pianist, civil rights activist, lived here in 1993–2003.
- Andrei Volkonsky (1933–2008), composer of classical music and harpsichordist, a descendant of Russian aristocratic princely family in exile, lived here in 1988–2008.
- Christophe Rousset (born 1961), conductor and harpsichordist, grew up here.
- Charles Trenet (1942–2001), poet, painter and singer, wrote several evergreens here.
- Bradley Cooper (born 1975), American actor, spent 6 months as an exchange student here whilst studying an English major and French minor at Georgetown University.
- Grégory Gaultier (born 1982), 2015 squash world champion
- Majid Rabah (born 1980), footballer

== Gallery ==
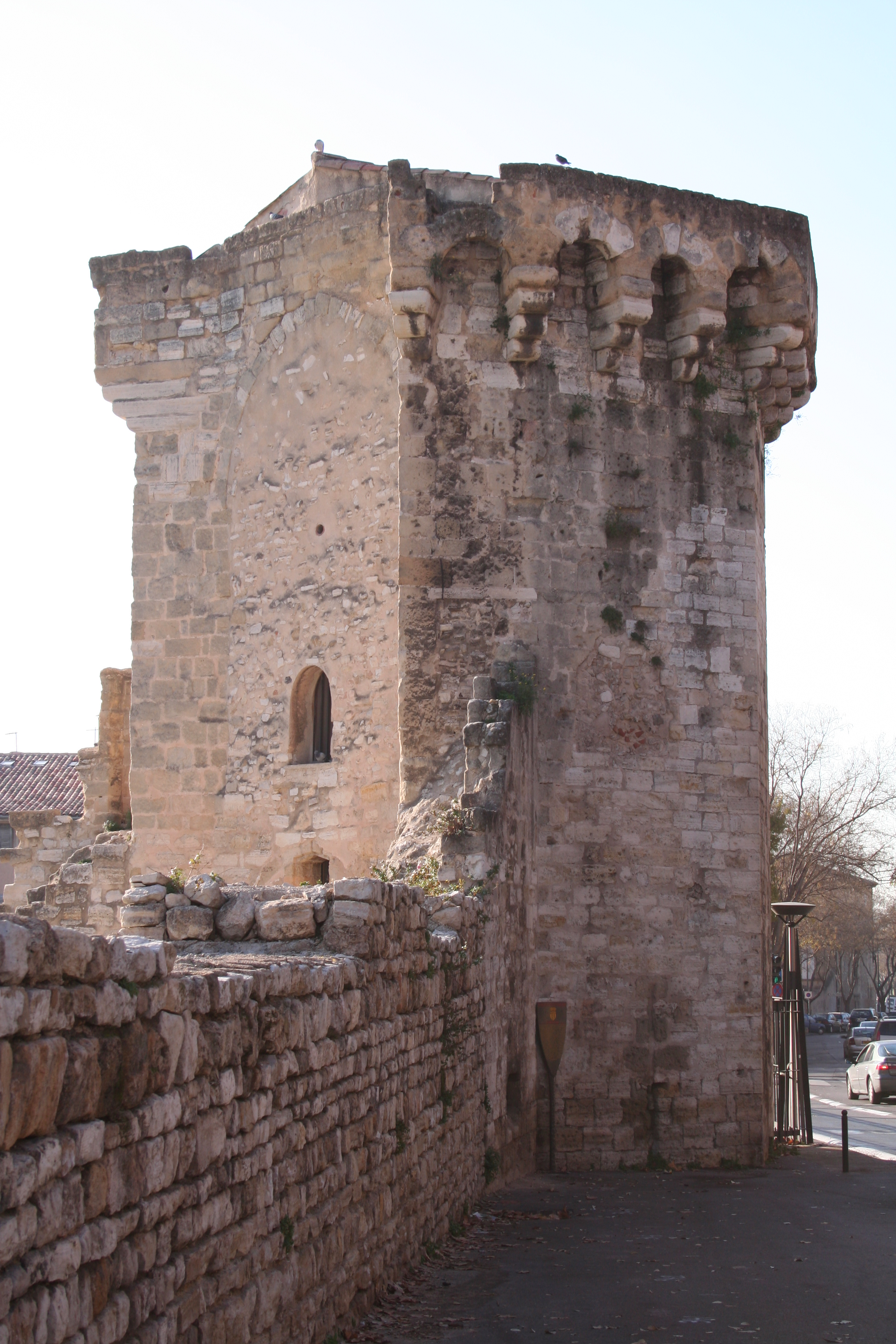
Medieval town wall near Roman baths

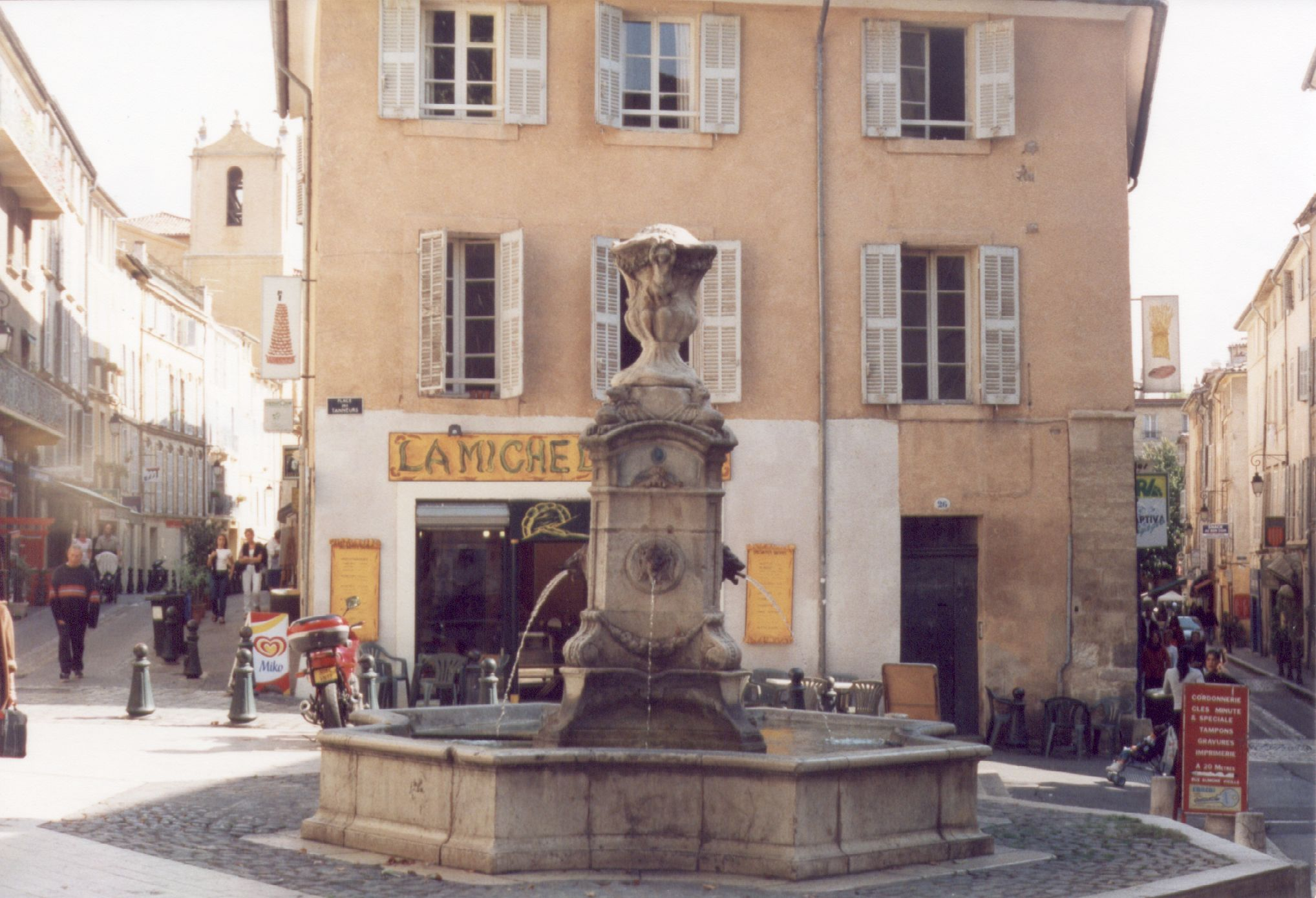
Place des Tanneurs

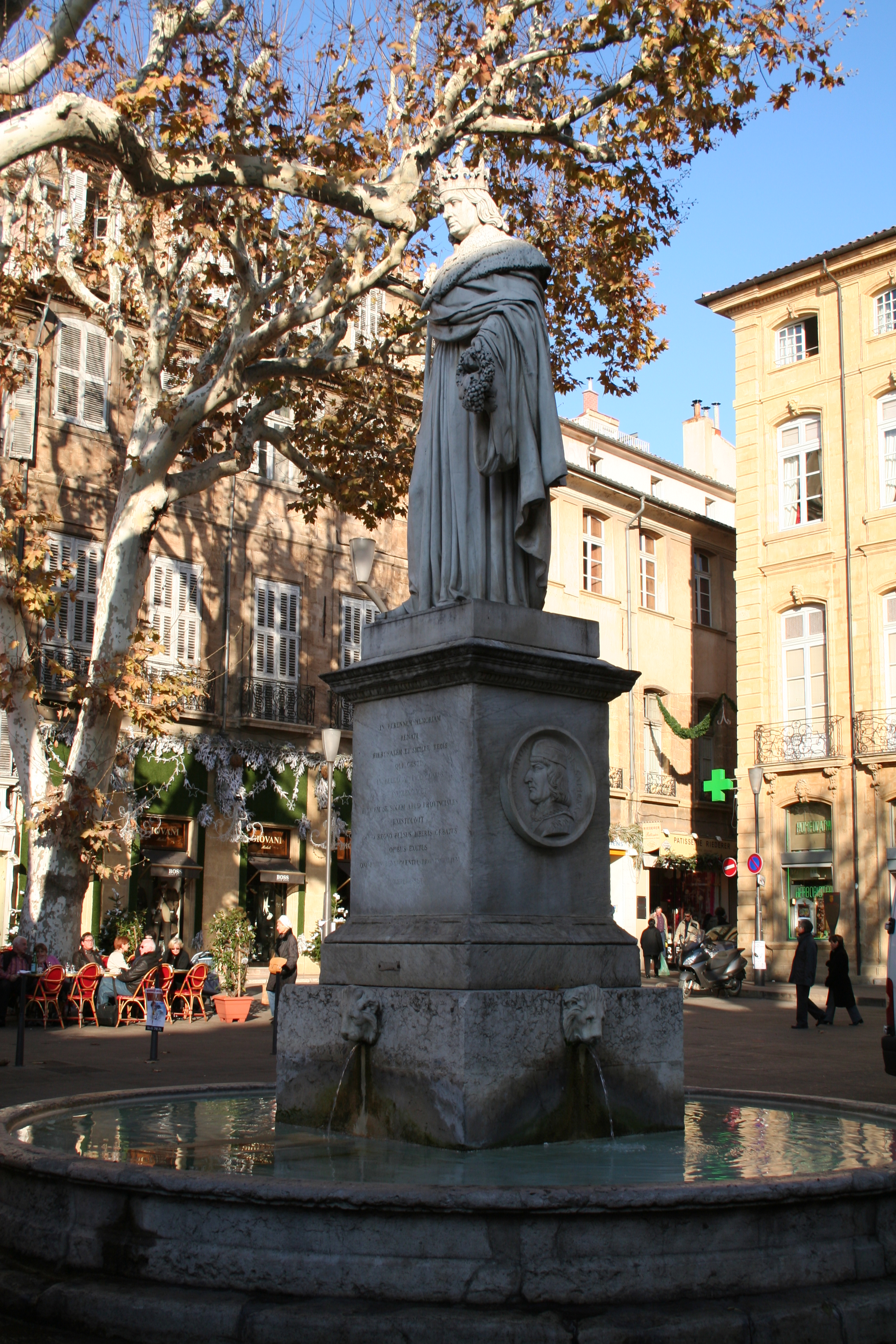
Statue of le Roi René

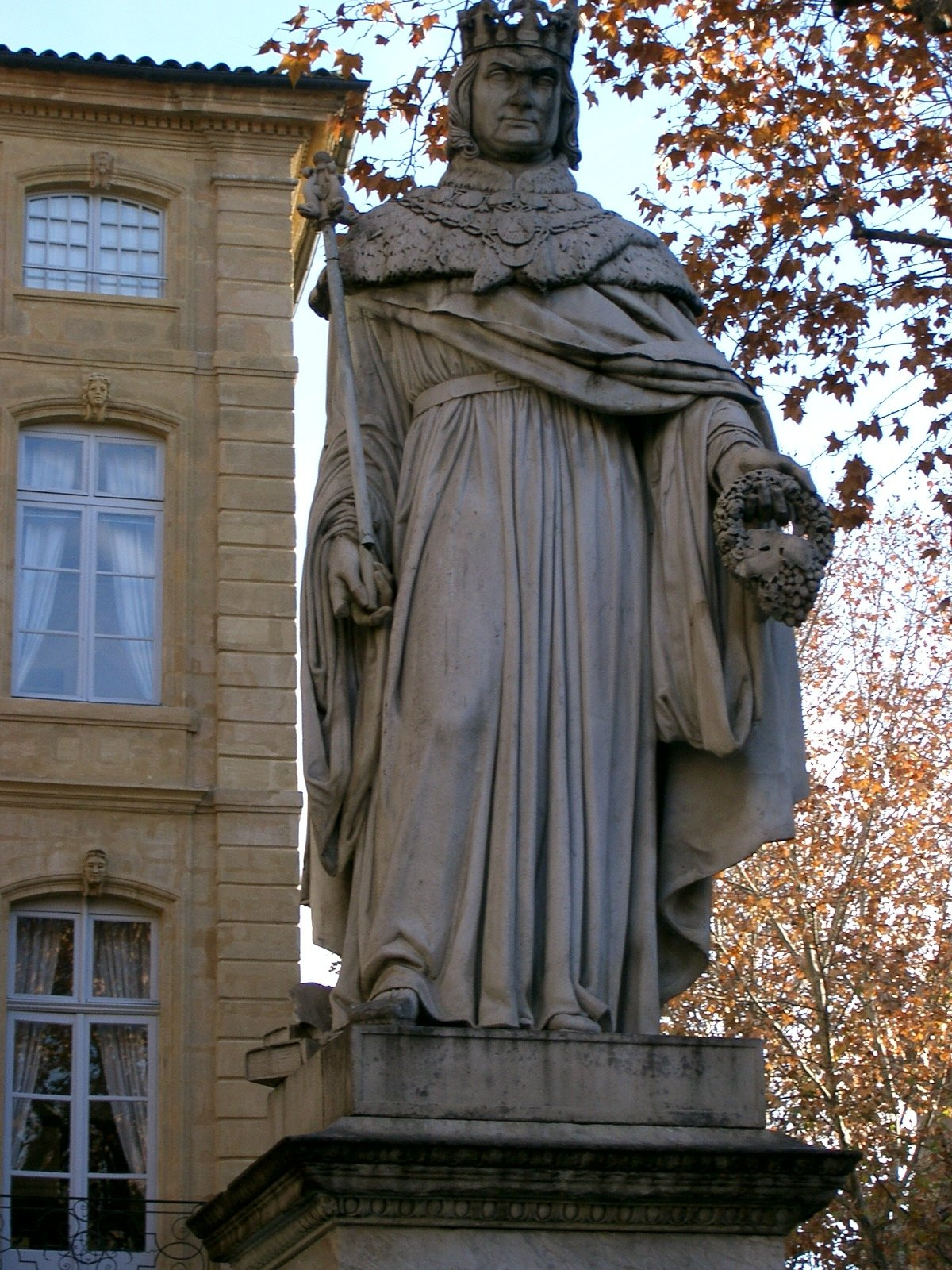
Detail of le Roi René

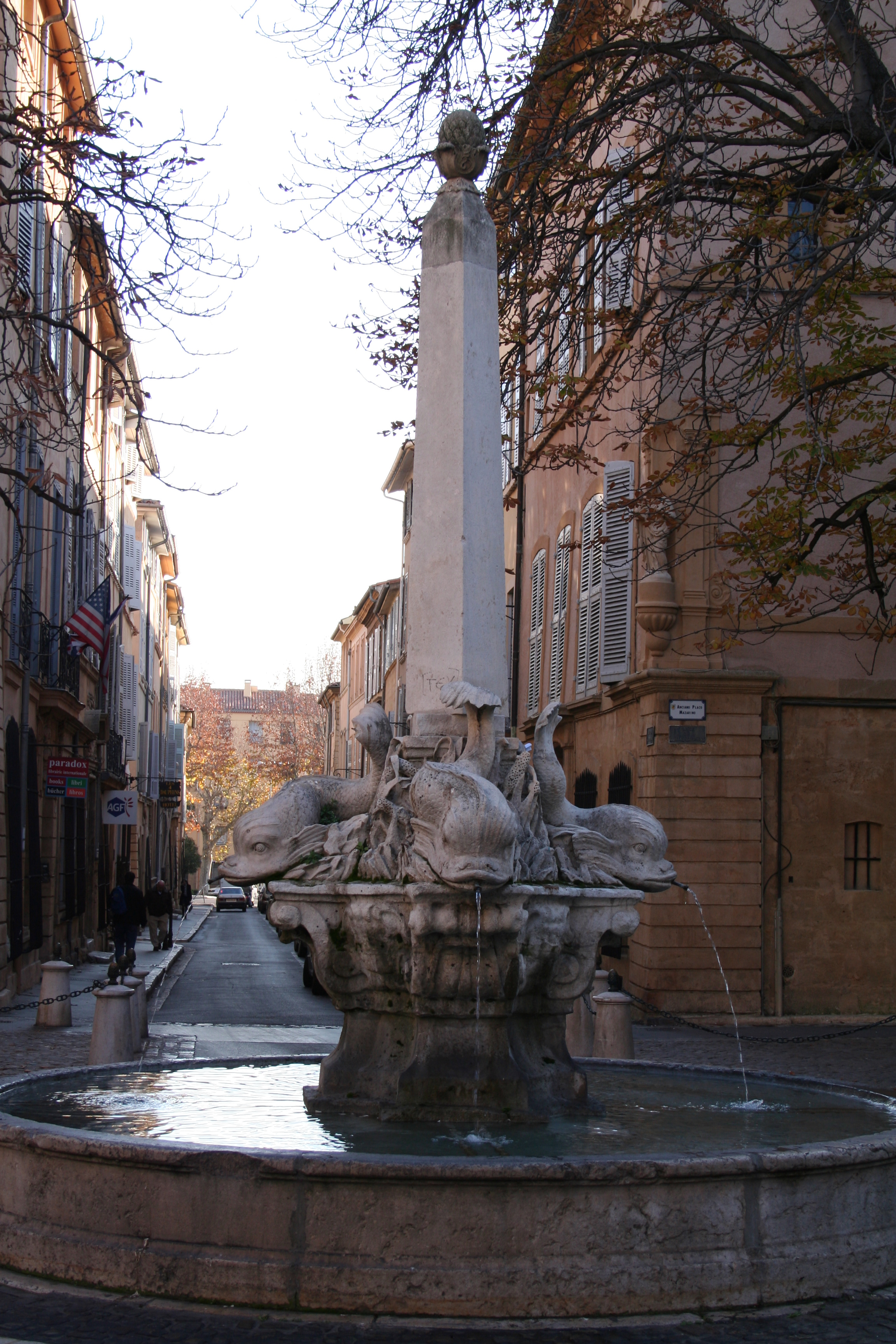
Place des Quatre Dauphins, towards the Boulevard extérieur

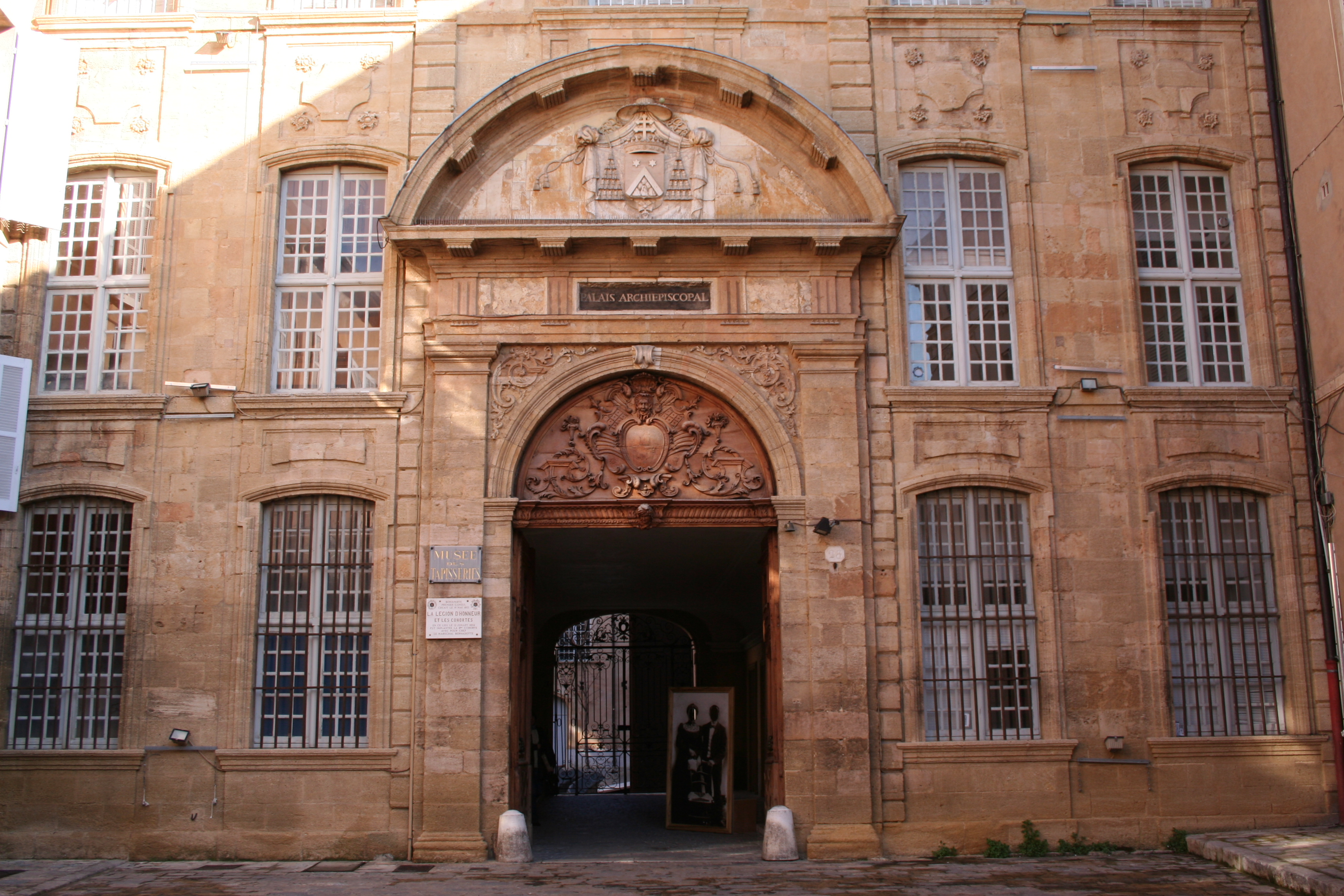
The archbishop's palace, opera house and tapestry museum

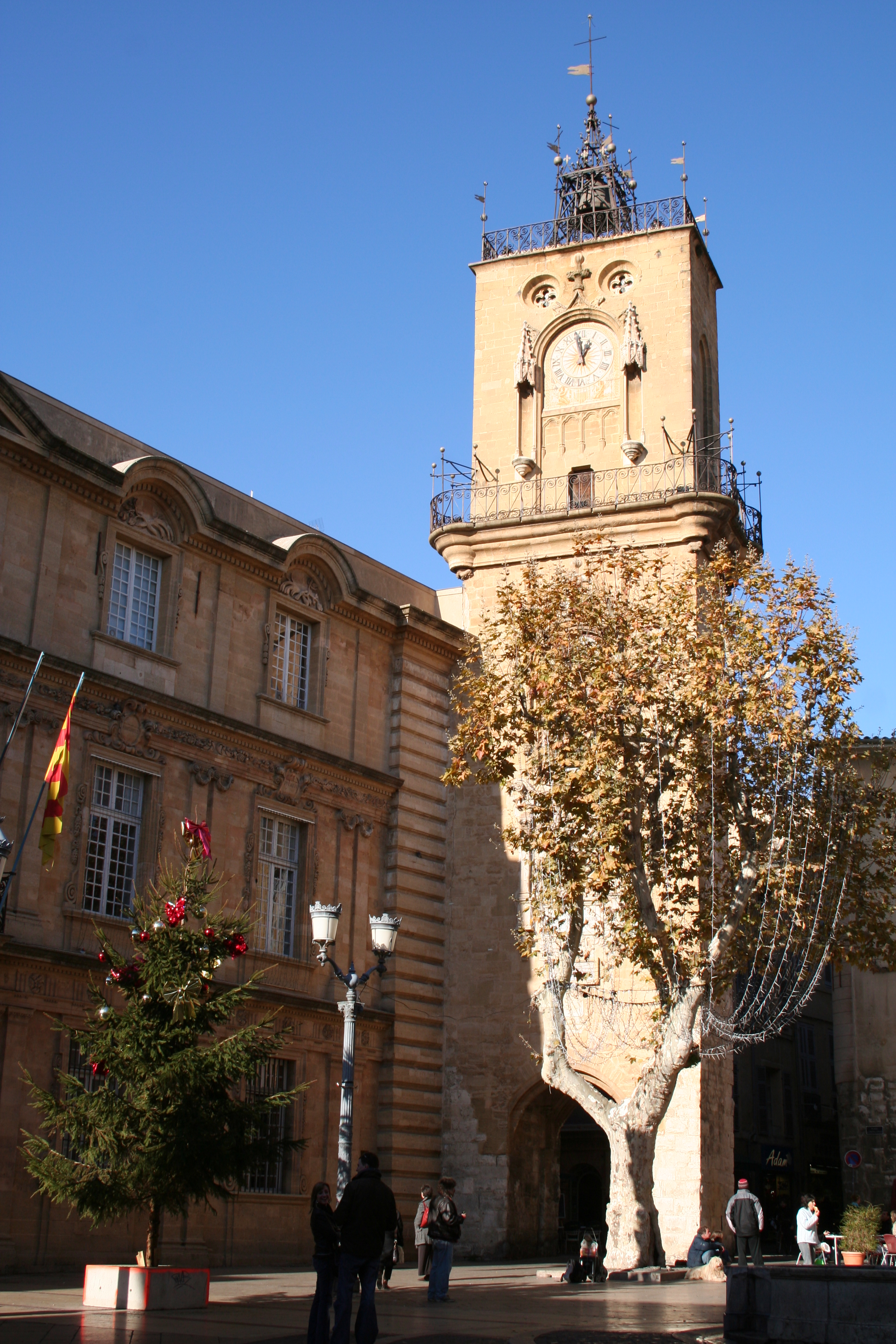
Clock tower, Hotel de Ville

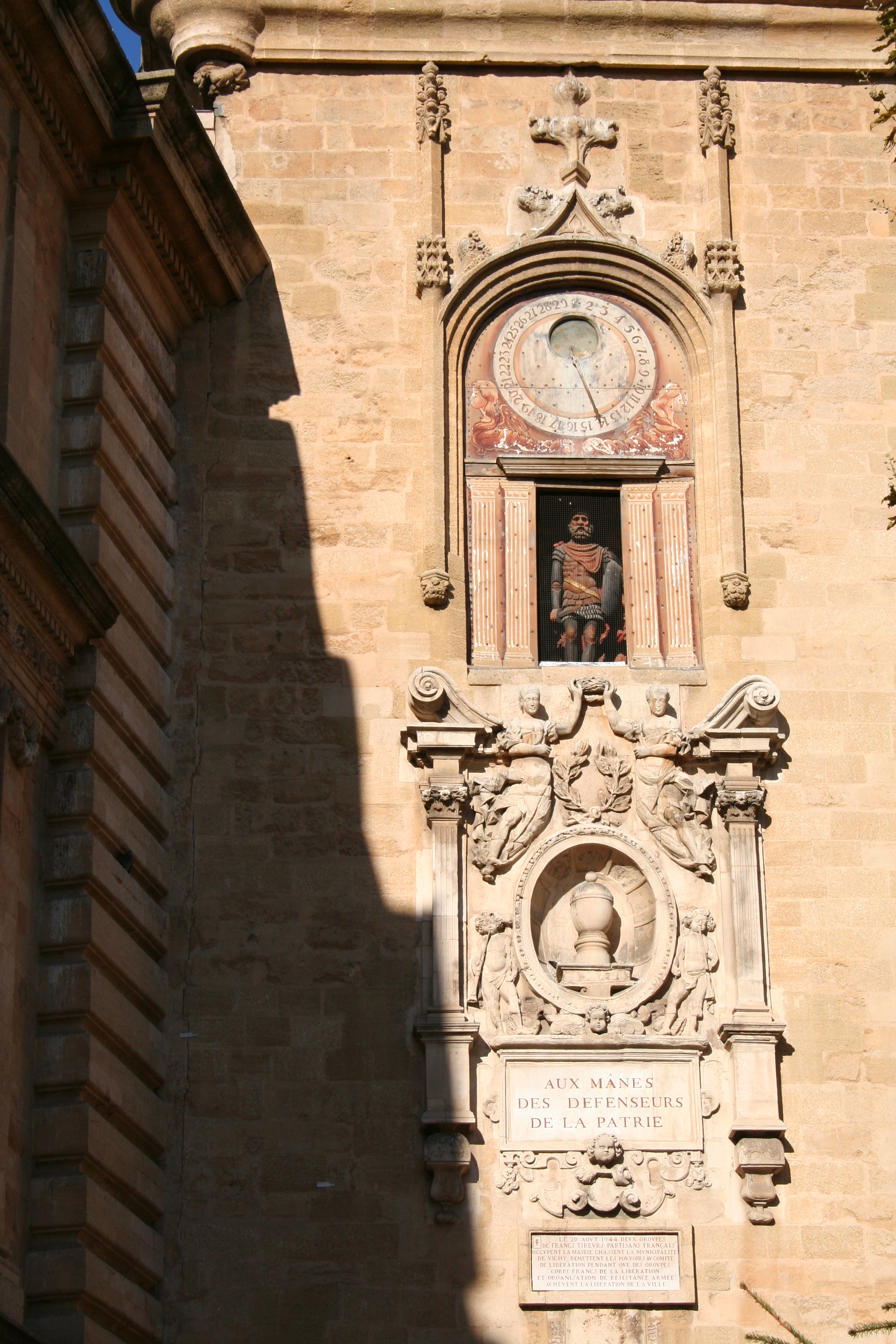
Detail of mechanical clock

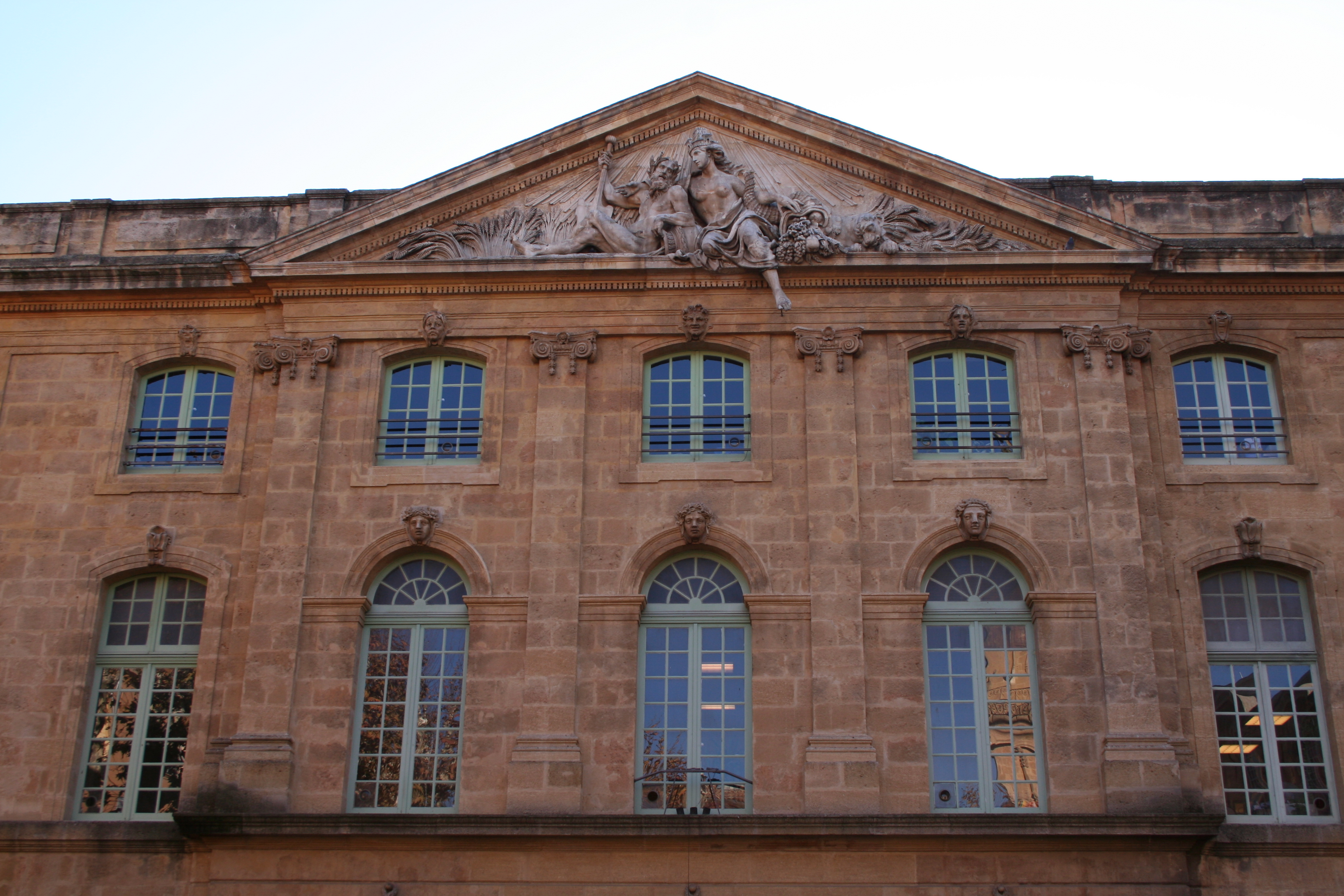
Bureau de Poste

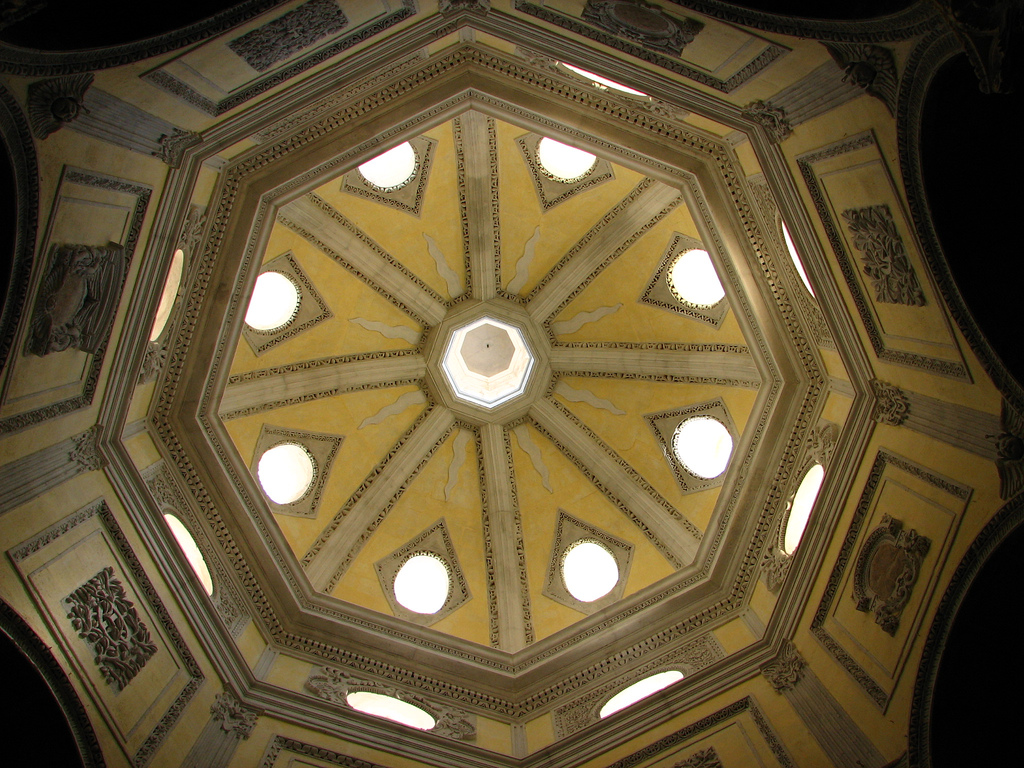
Aix Cathedral, Dome

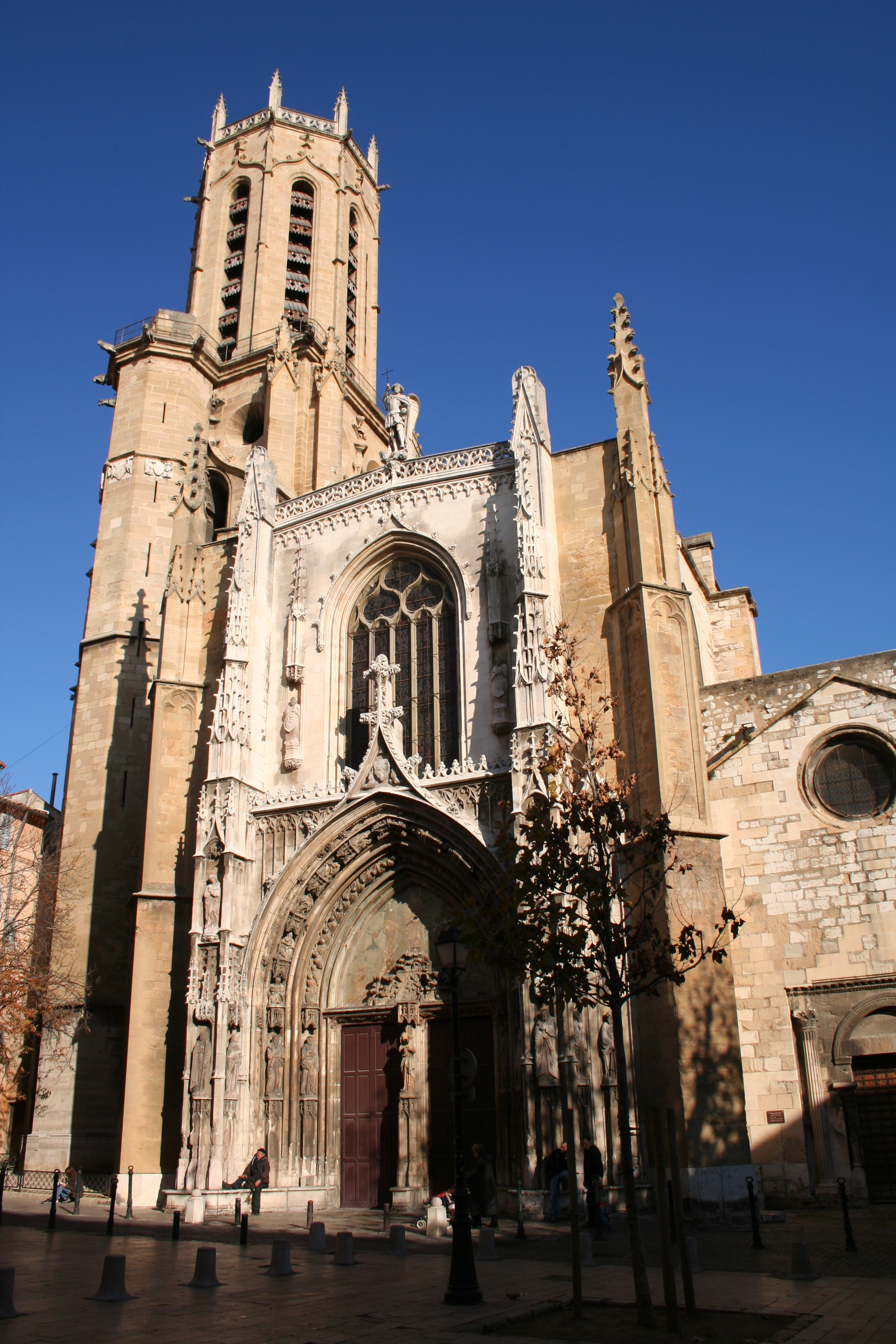
Aix Cathedral

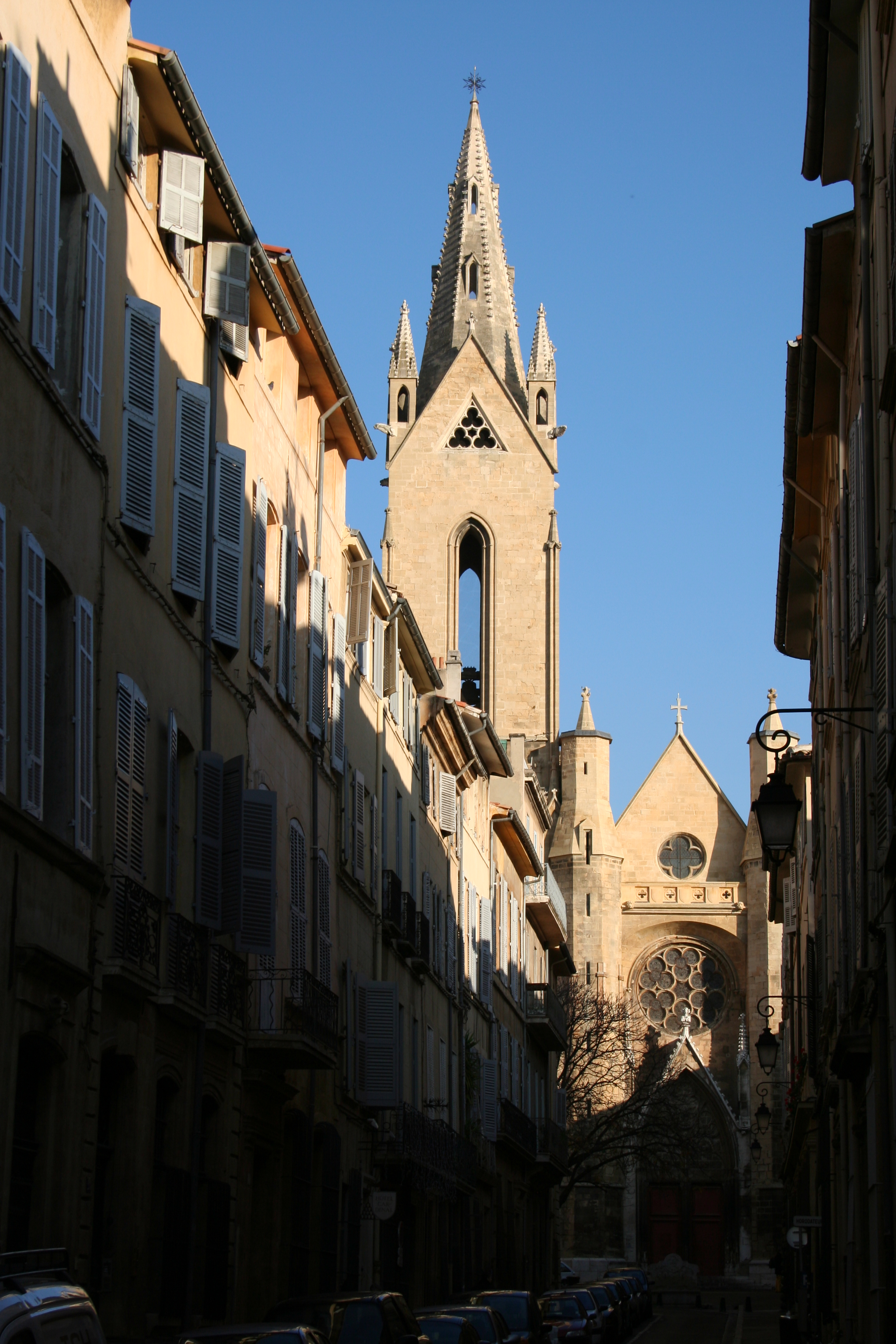
St Jean de Malte, rue Cardinale

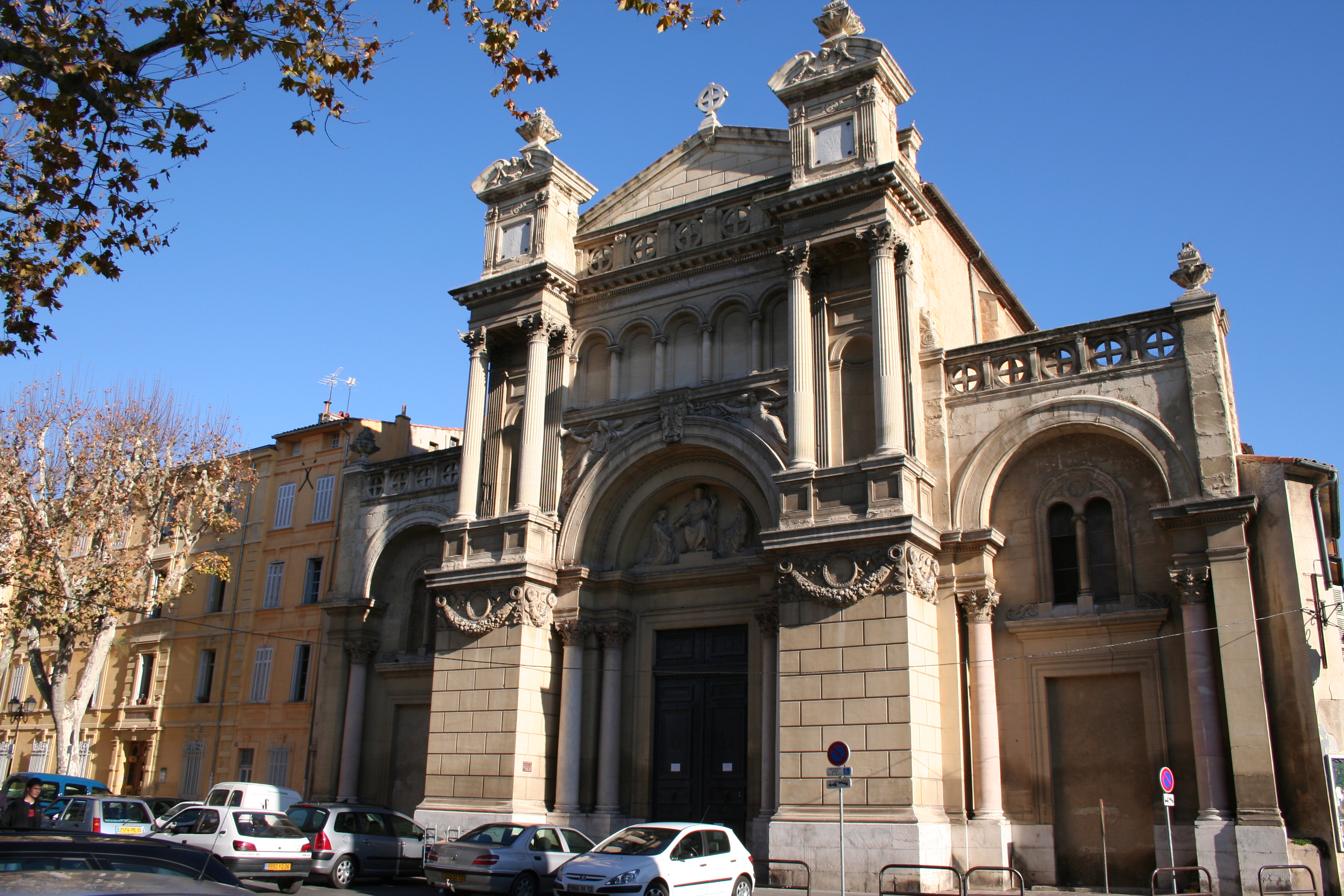
Église de la Madeleine, place des Precheurs

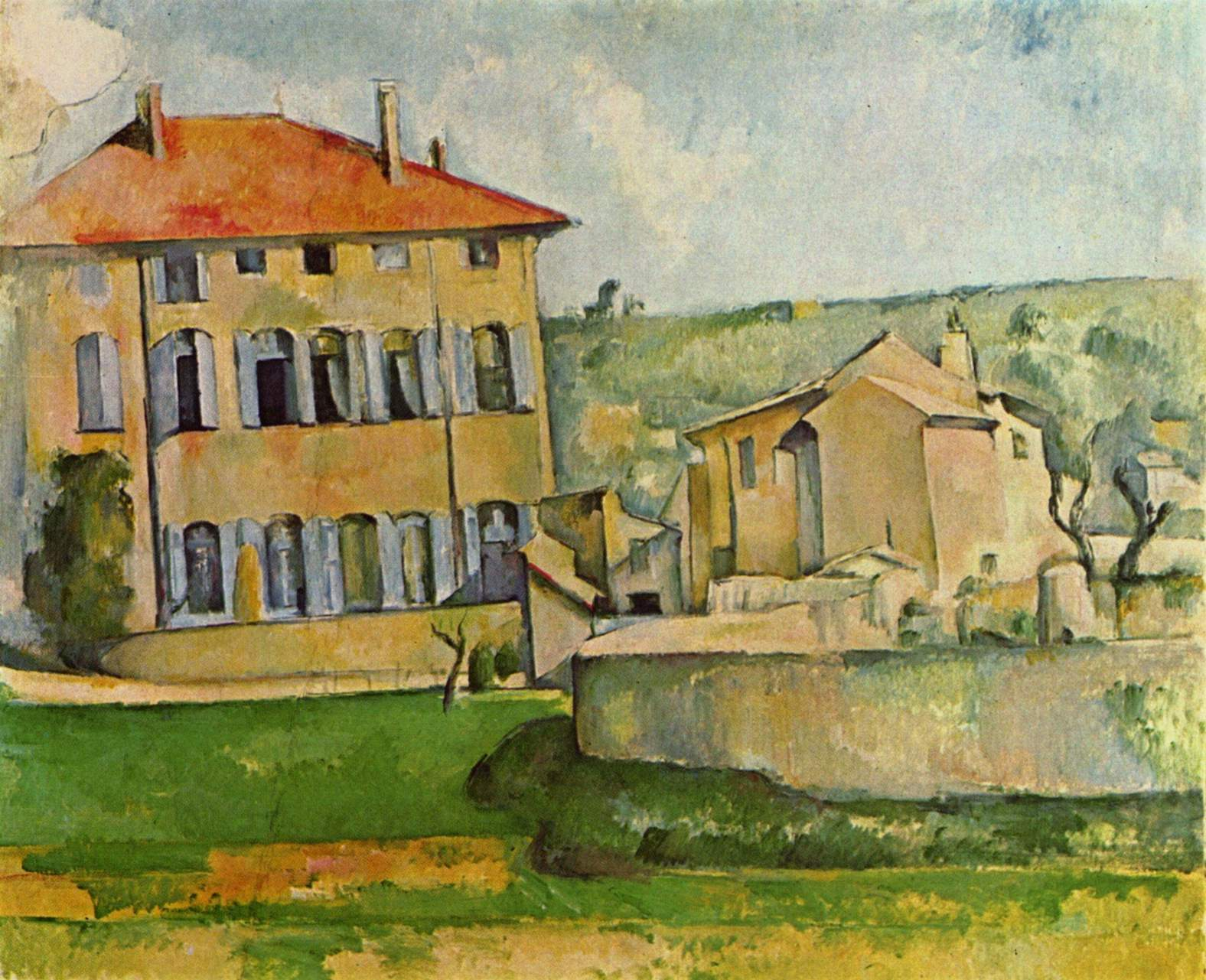
Jas de Bouffan, Paul Cézanne

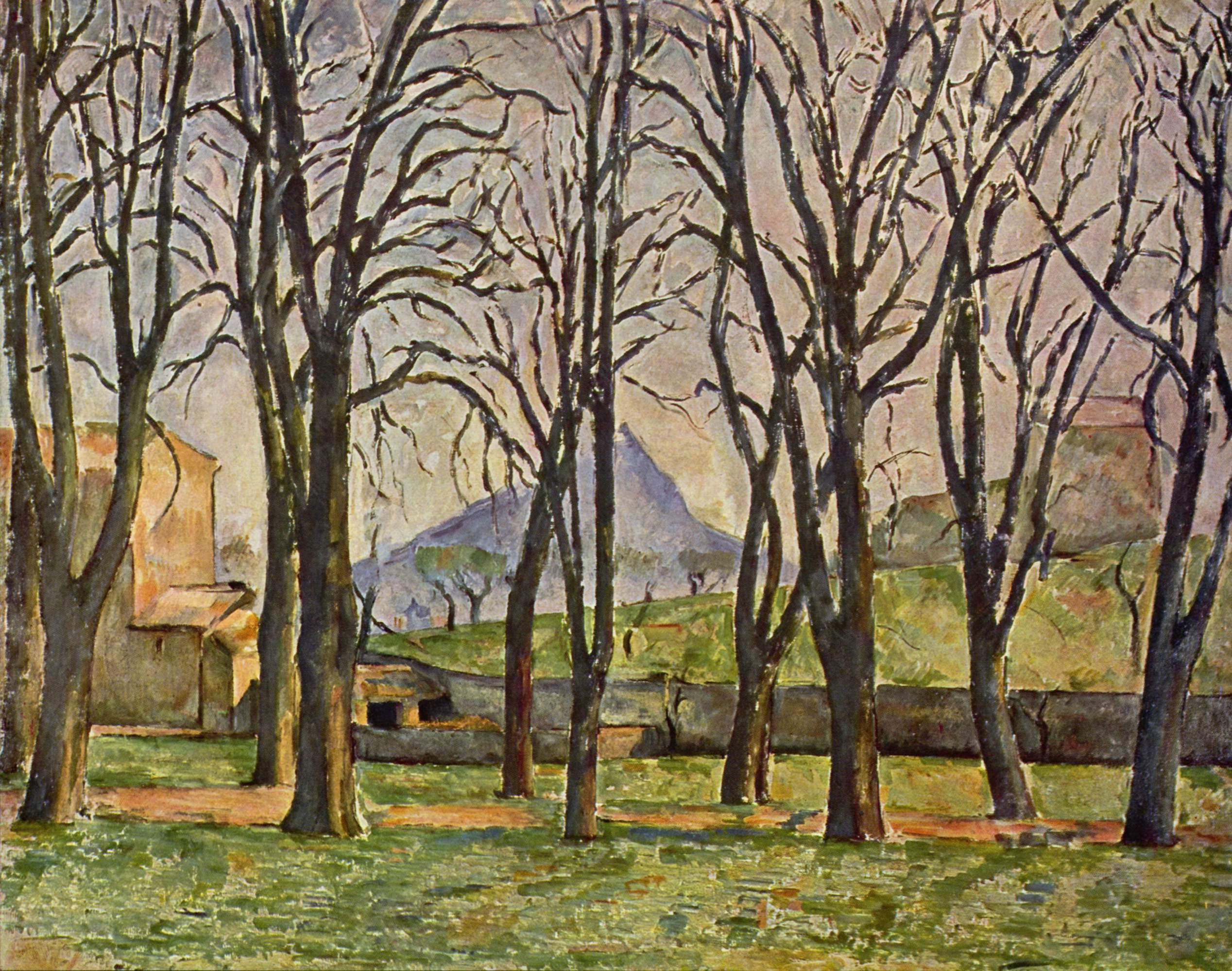
Jas de Bouffan, Paul Cézanne

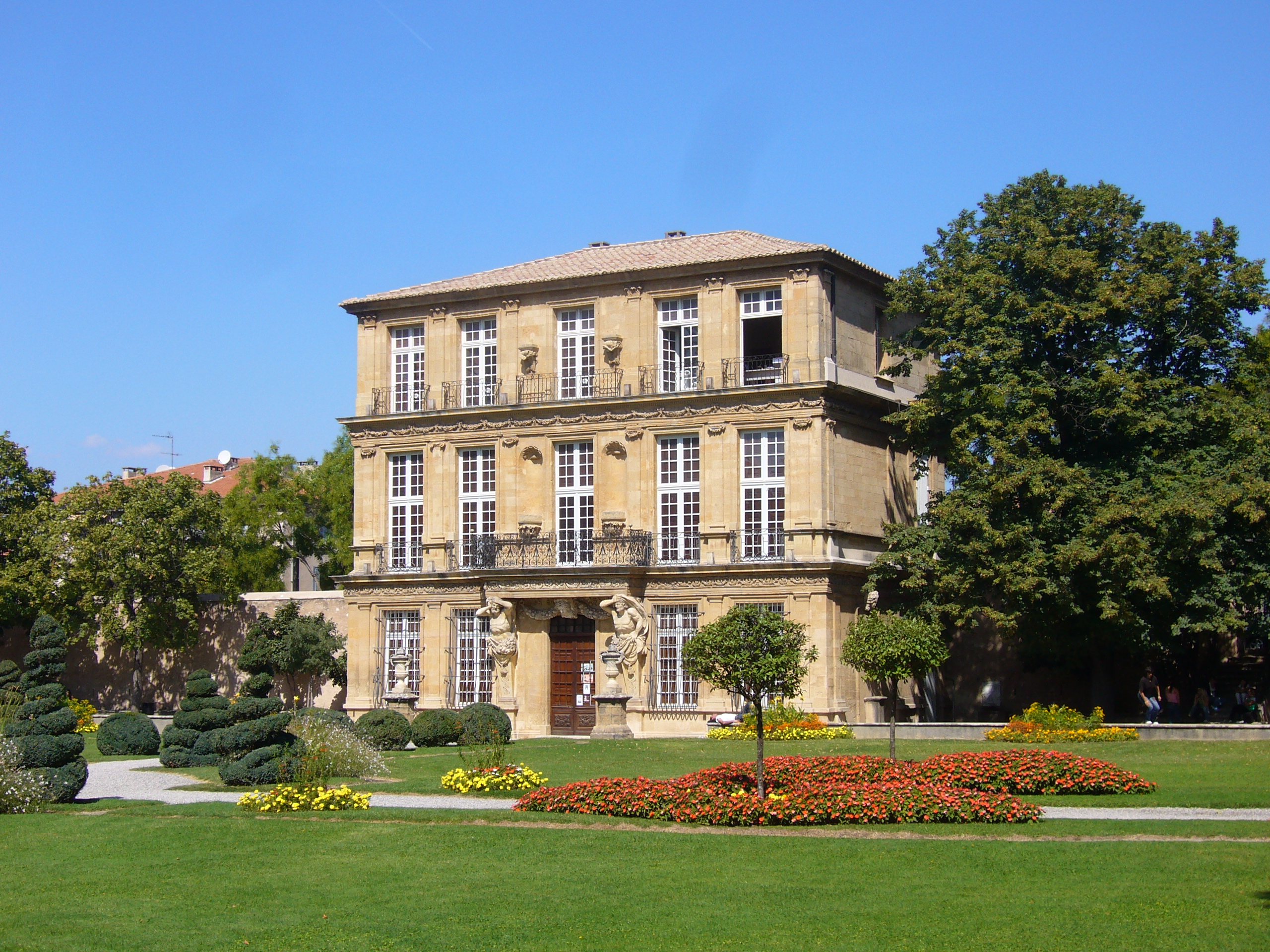
The Pavillon Vendôme

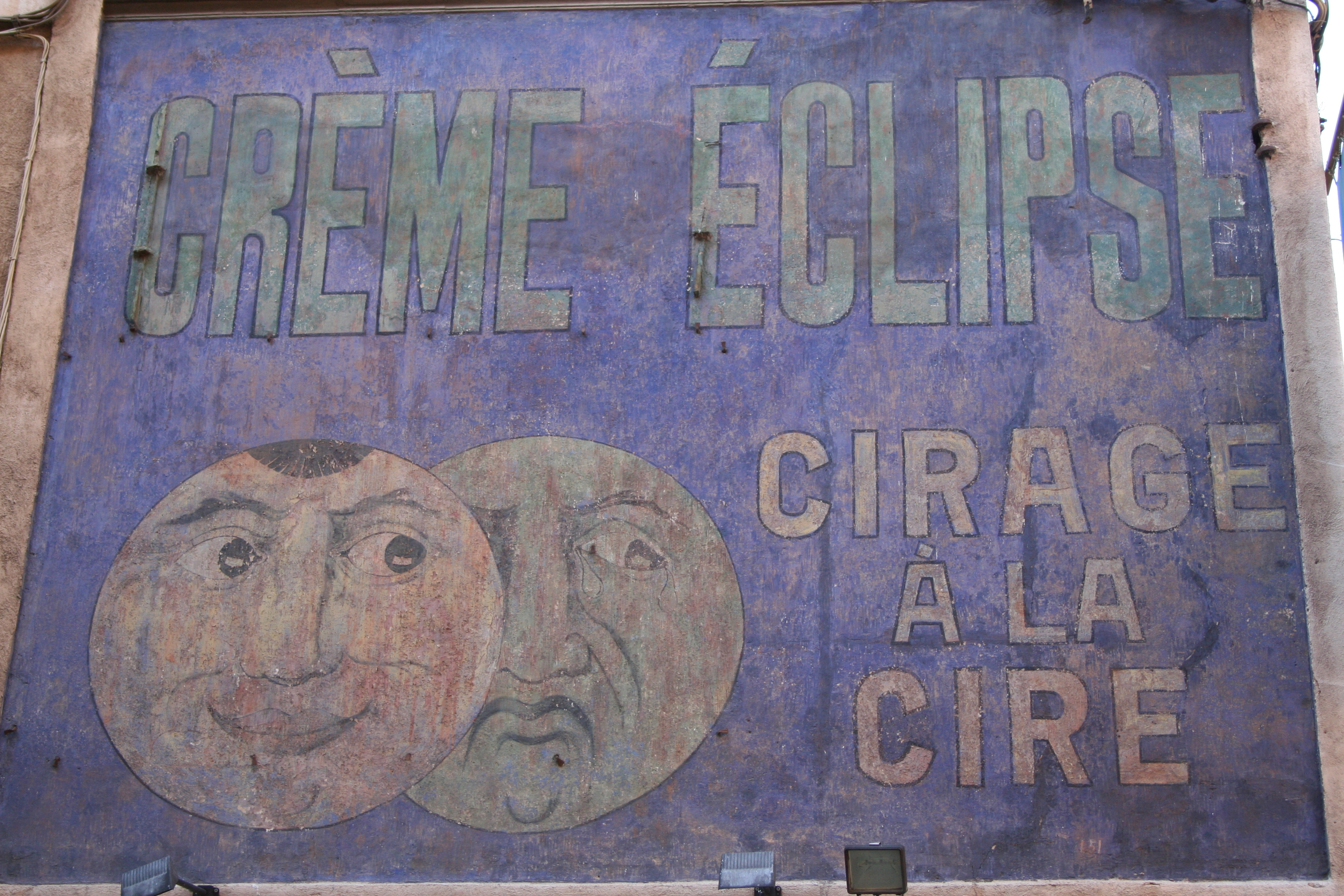
Mural advertisement

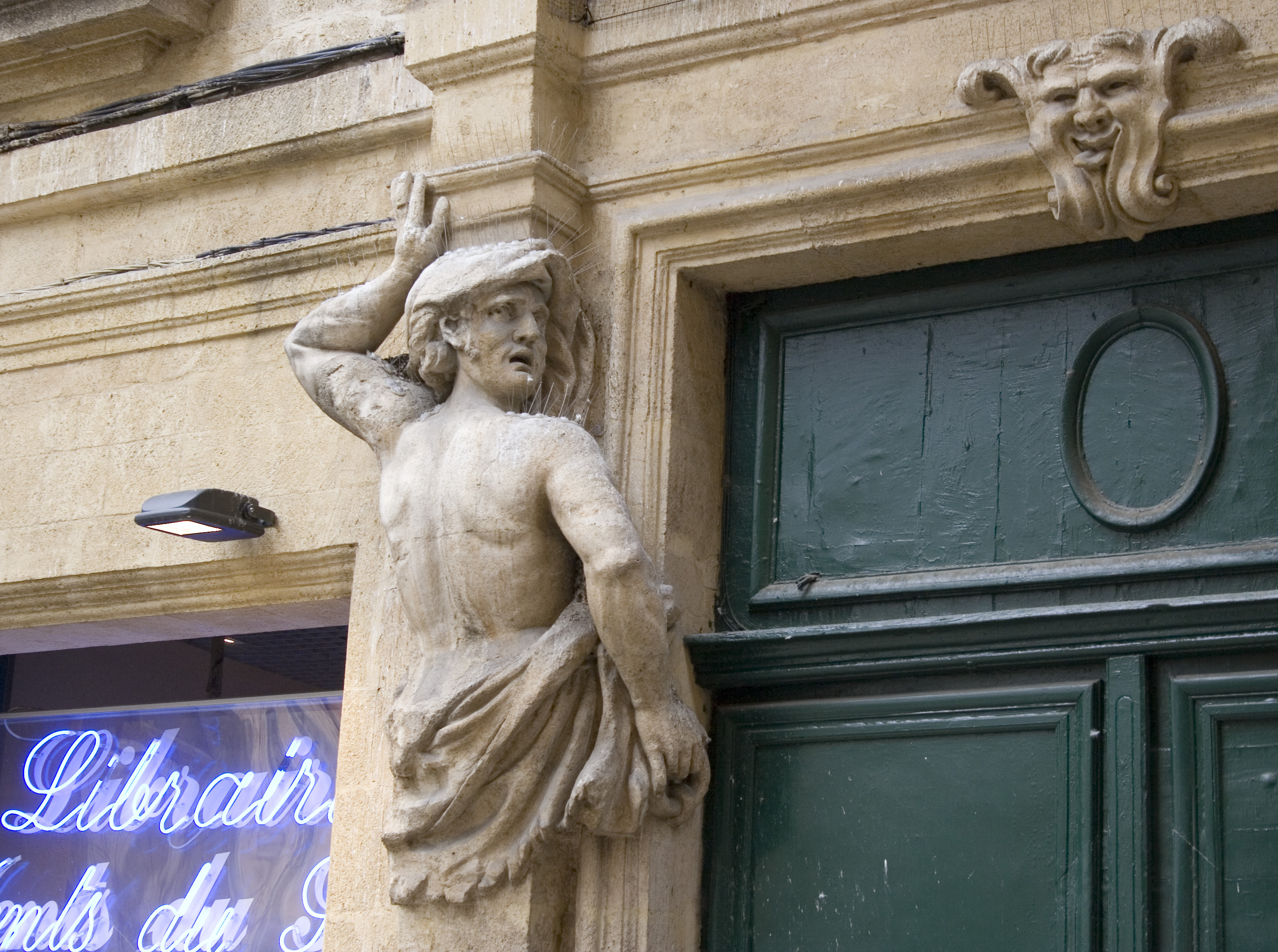
Atlas on a doorway in Aix

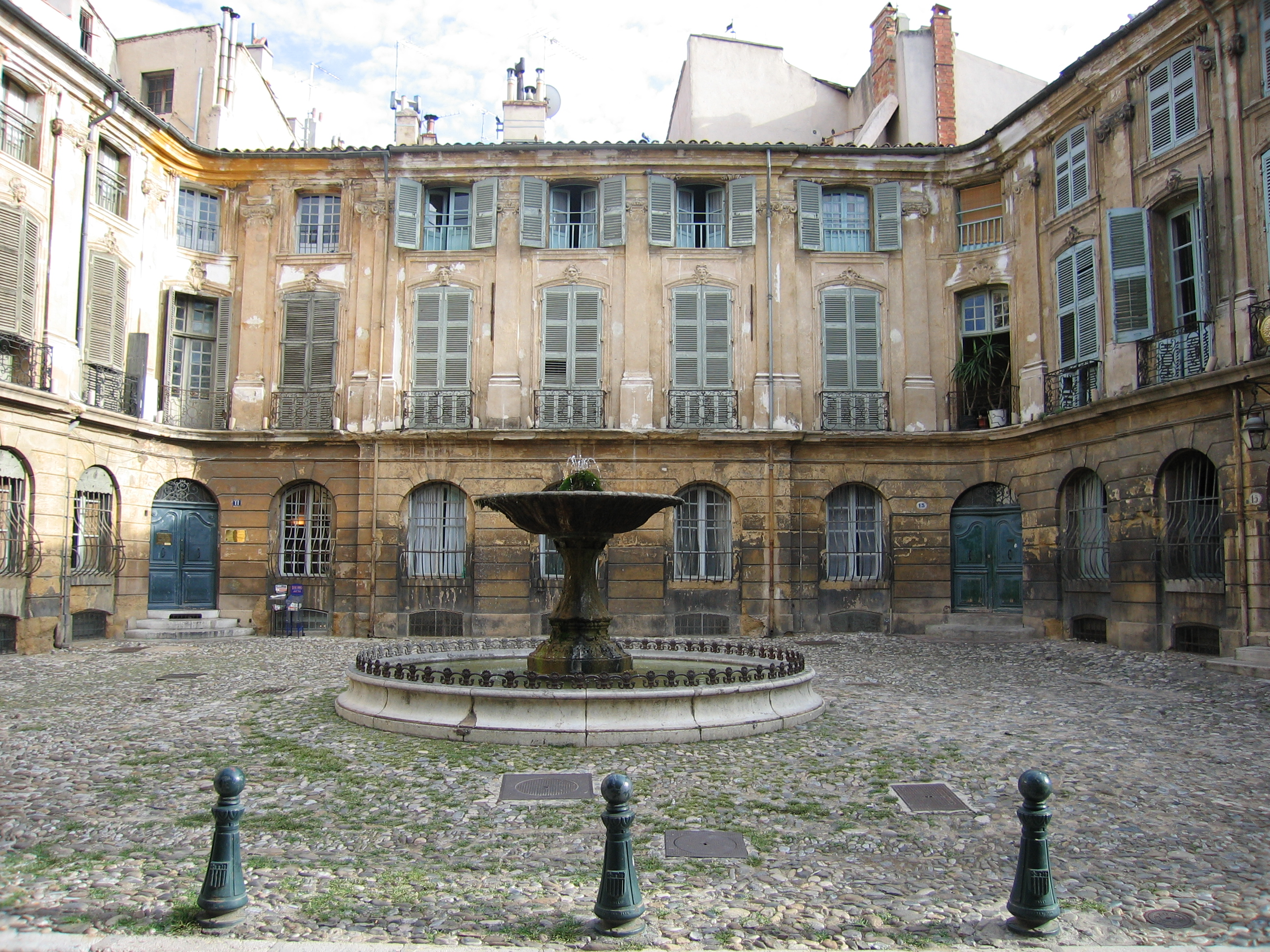
The place d'Albertas

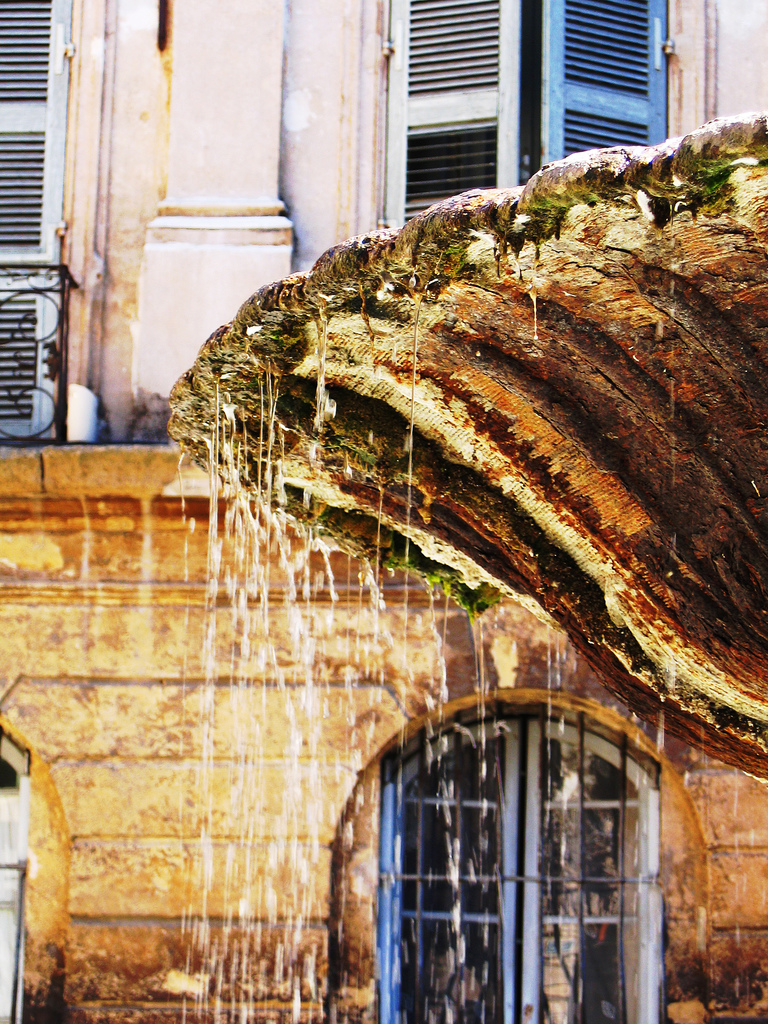
Fountain in the place d'Albertas

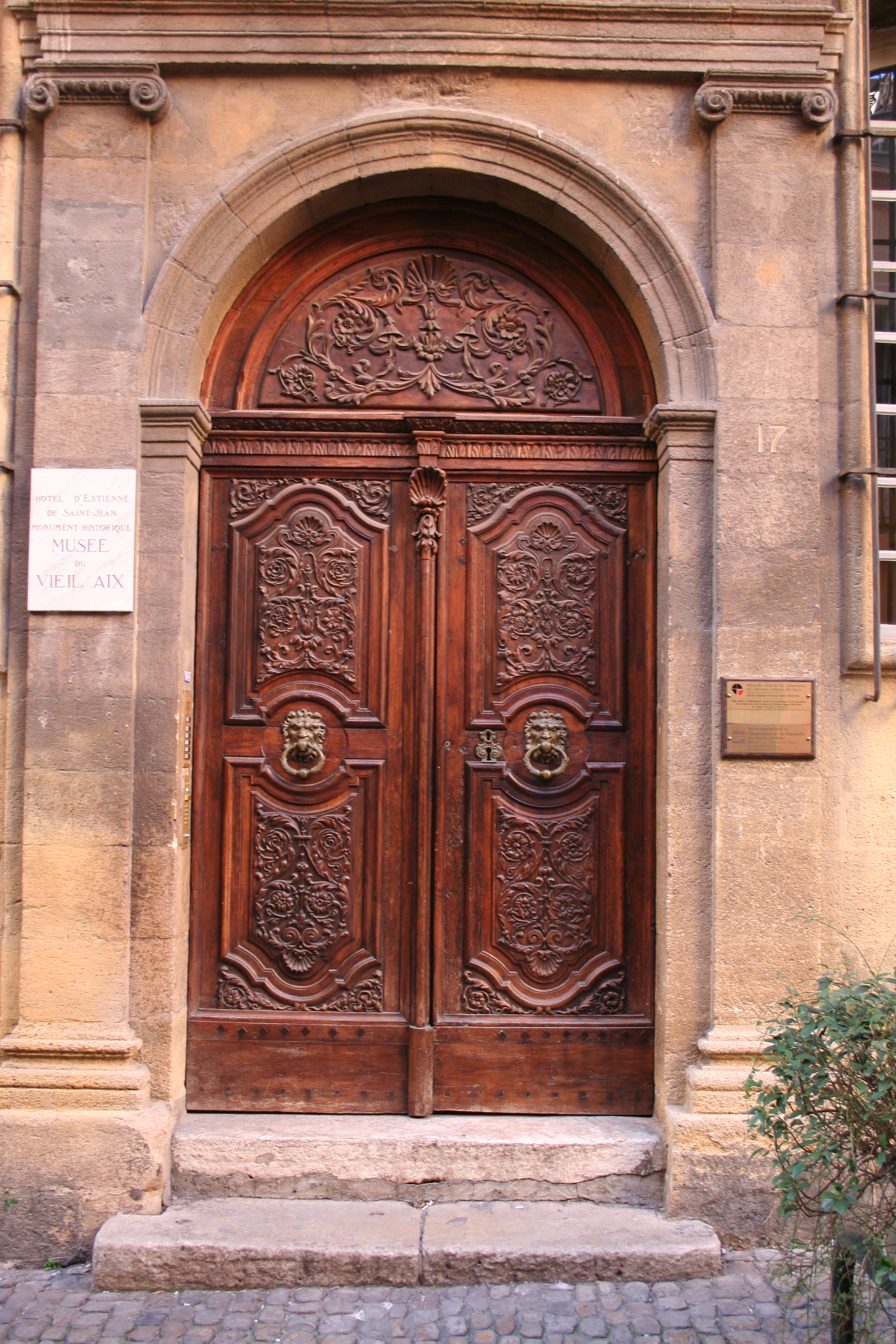
Door carving in Aix

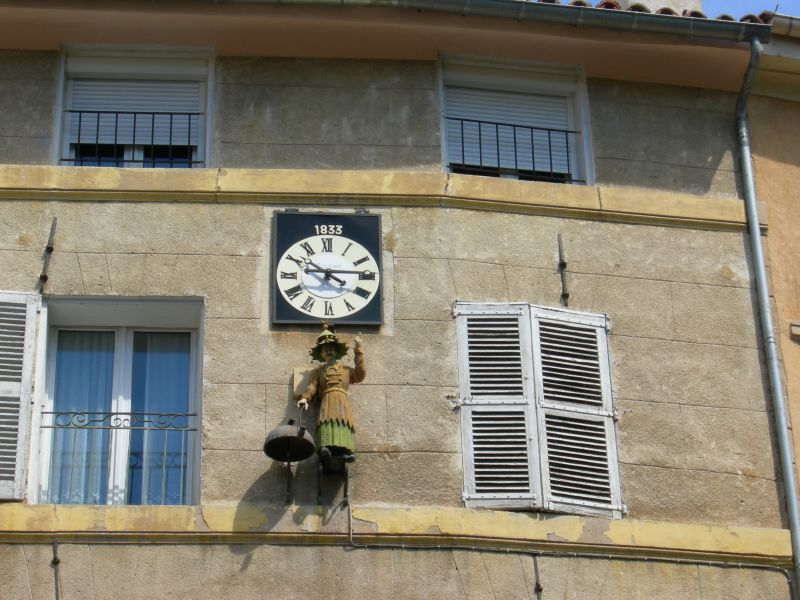
Mechanical clock, place des Precheurs

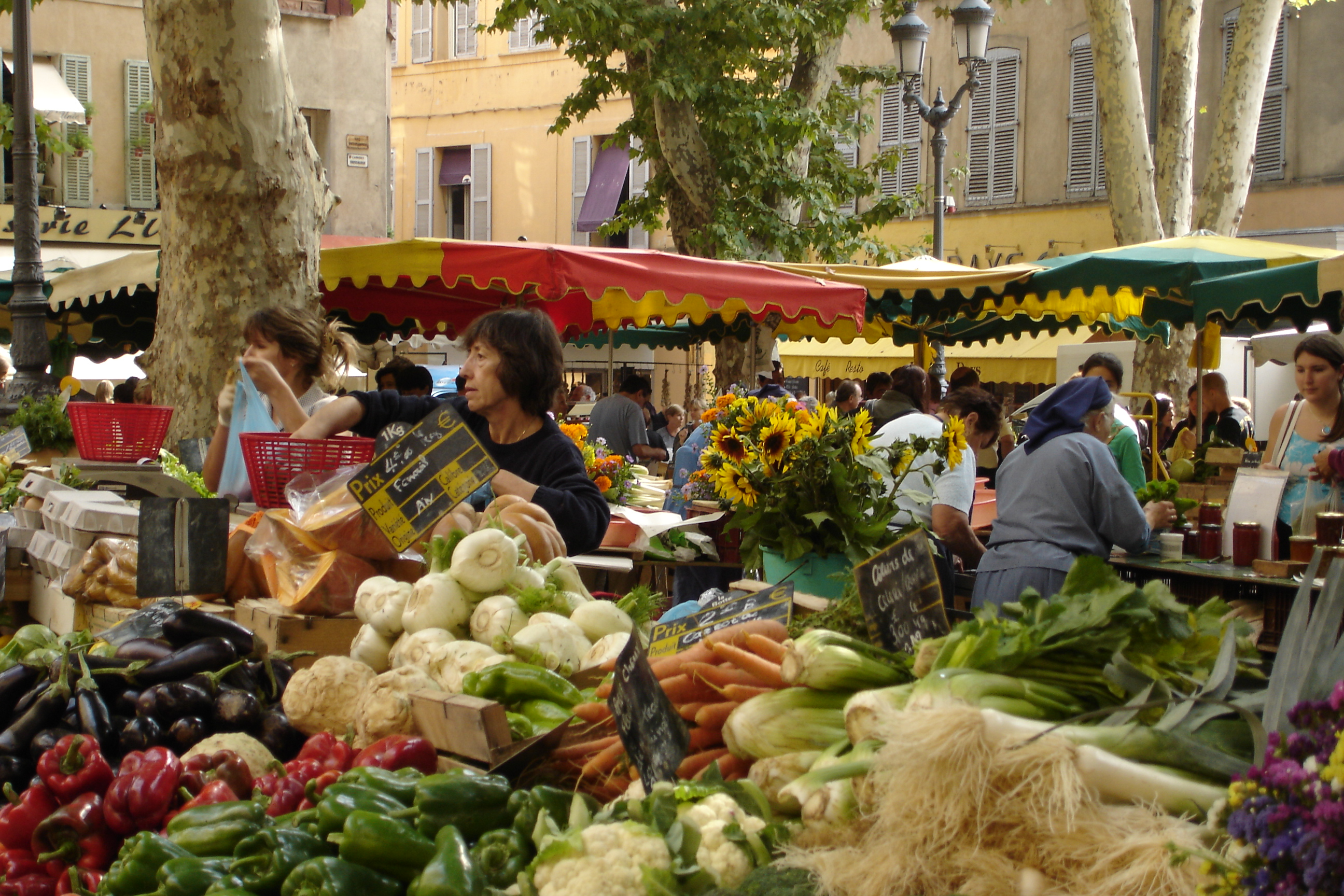
Daily vegetable market, place Richelme

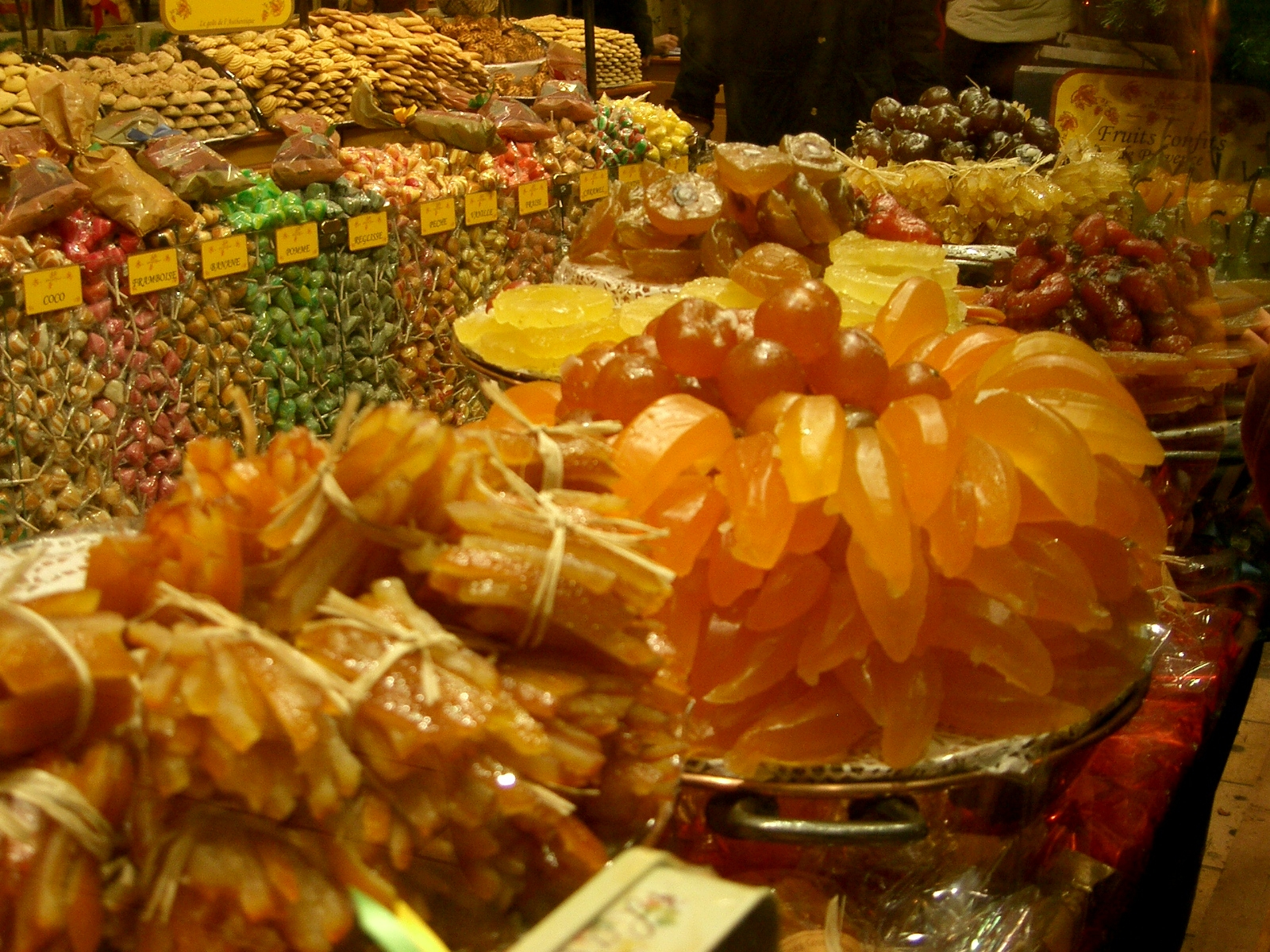
Provençal confectionery

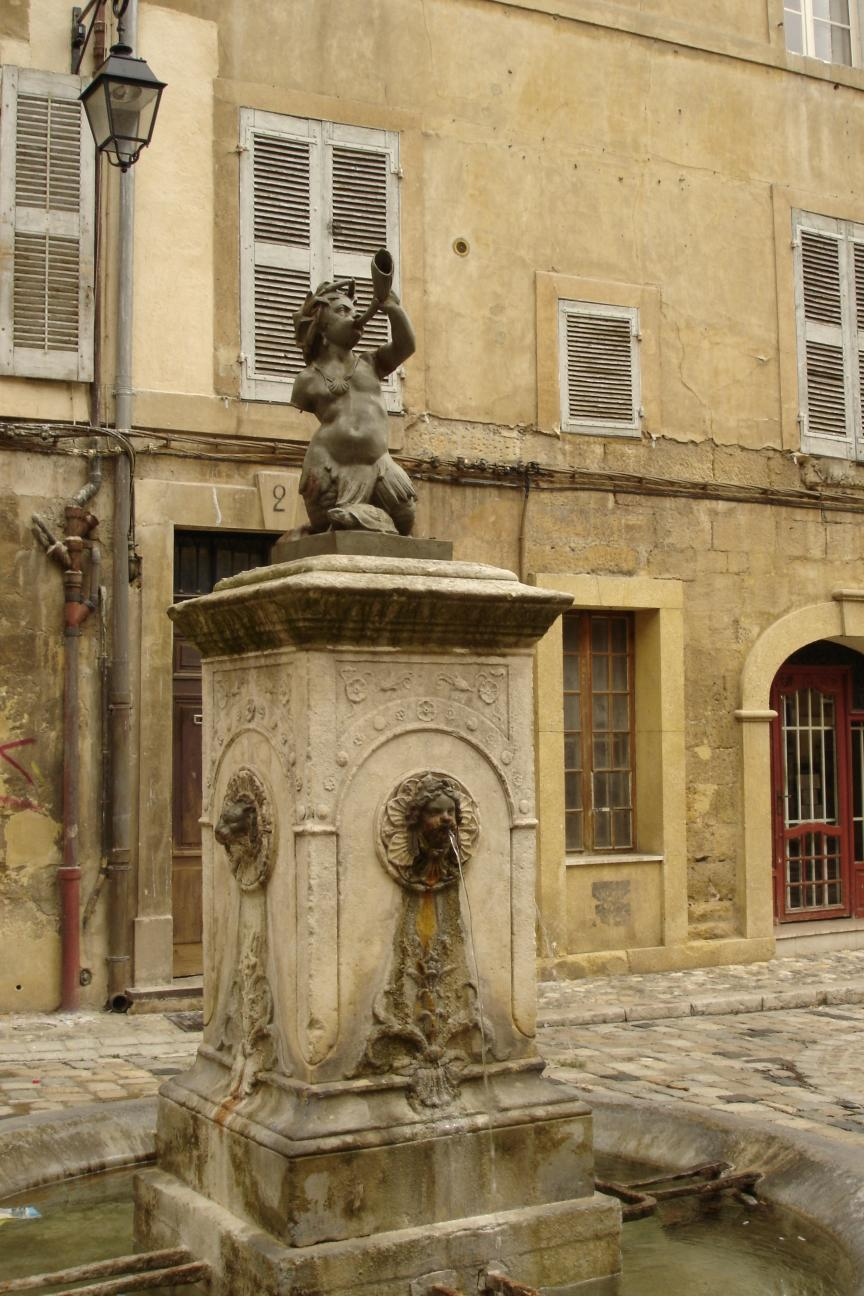
Baroque fountain in Aix

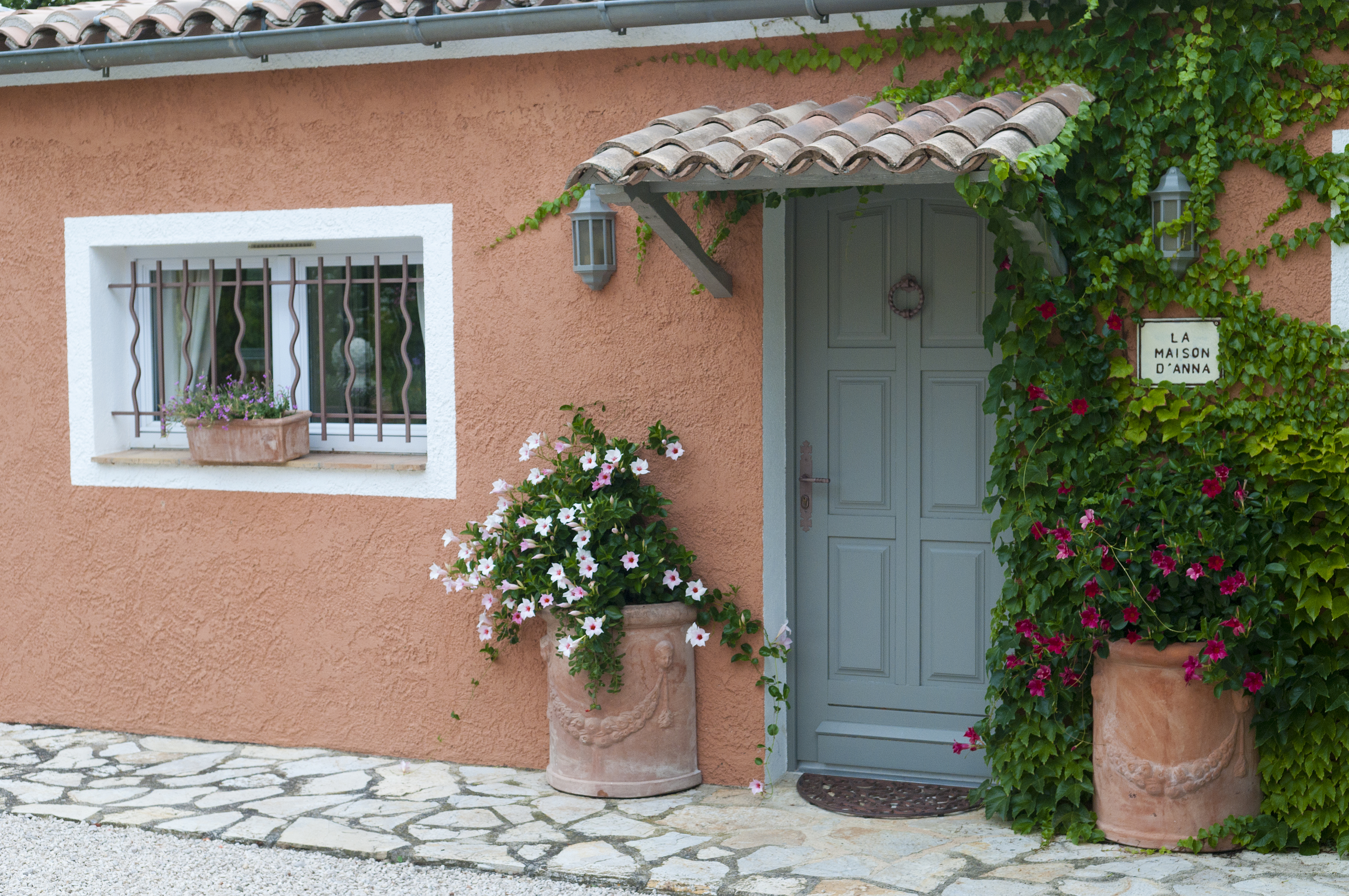
Provençal House

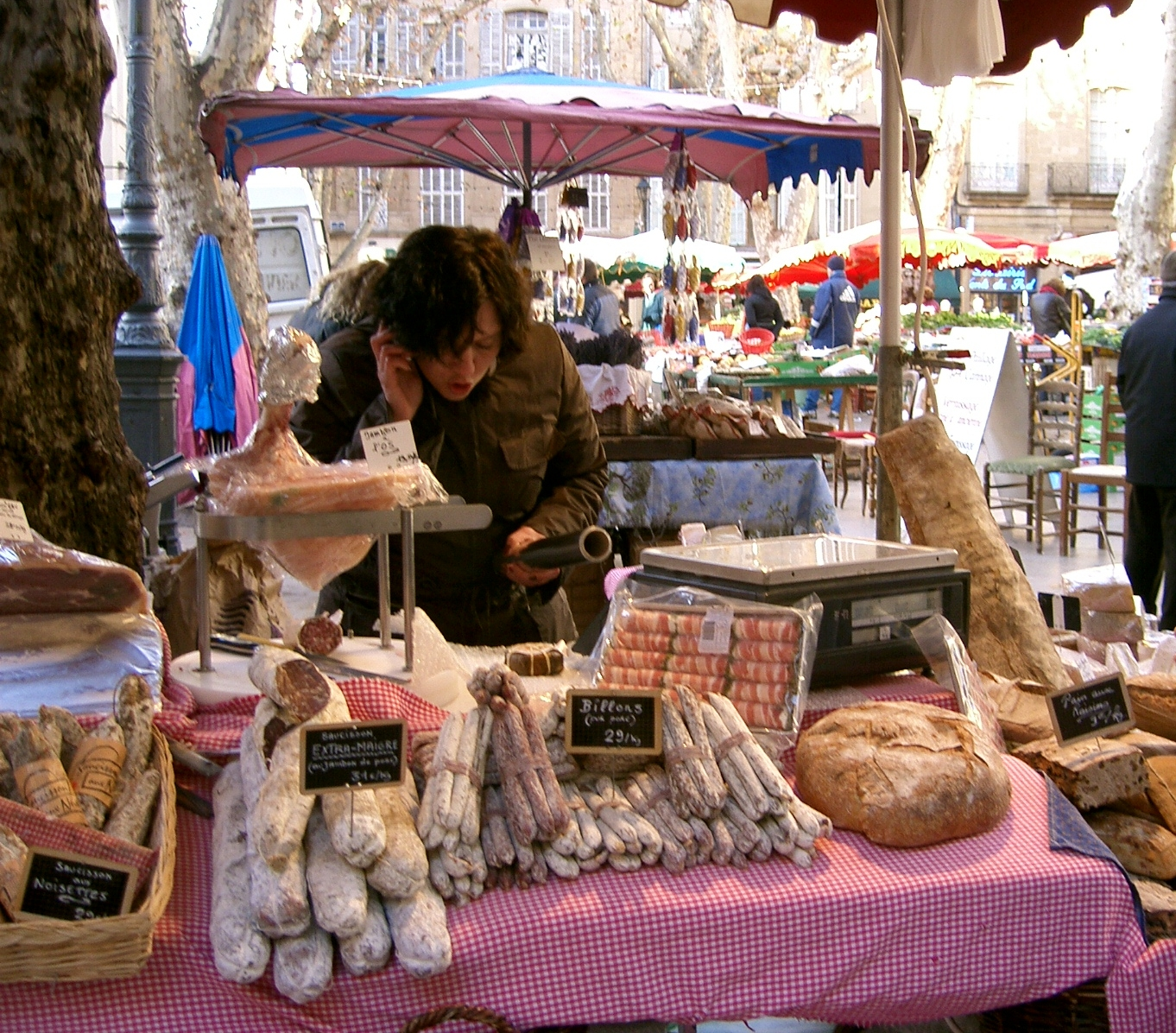
Provençal market

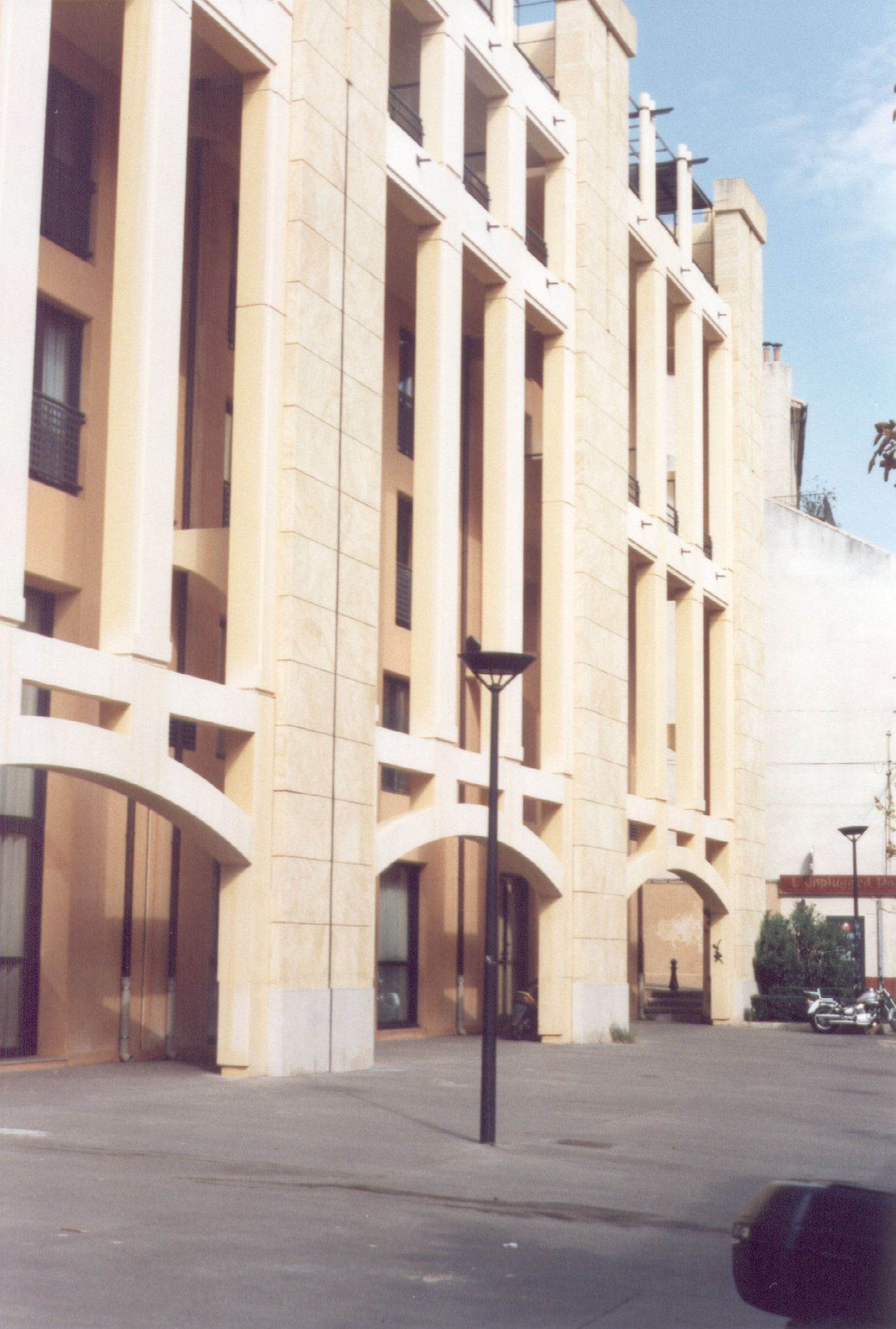
The modern spa in Aix

The Vasarely Foundation

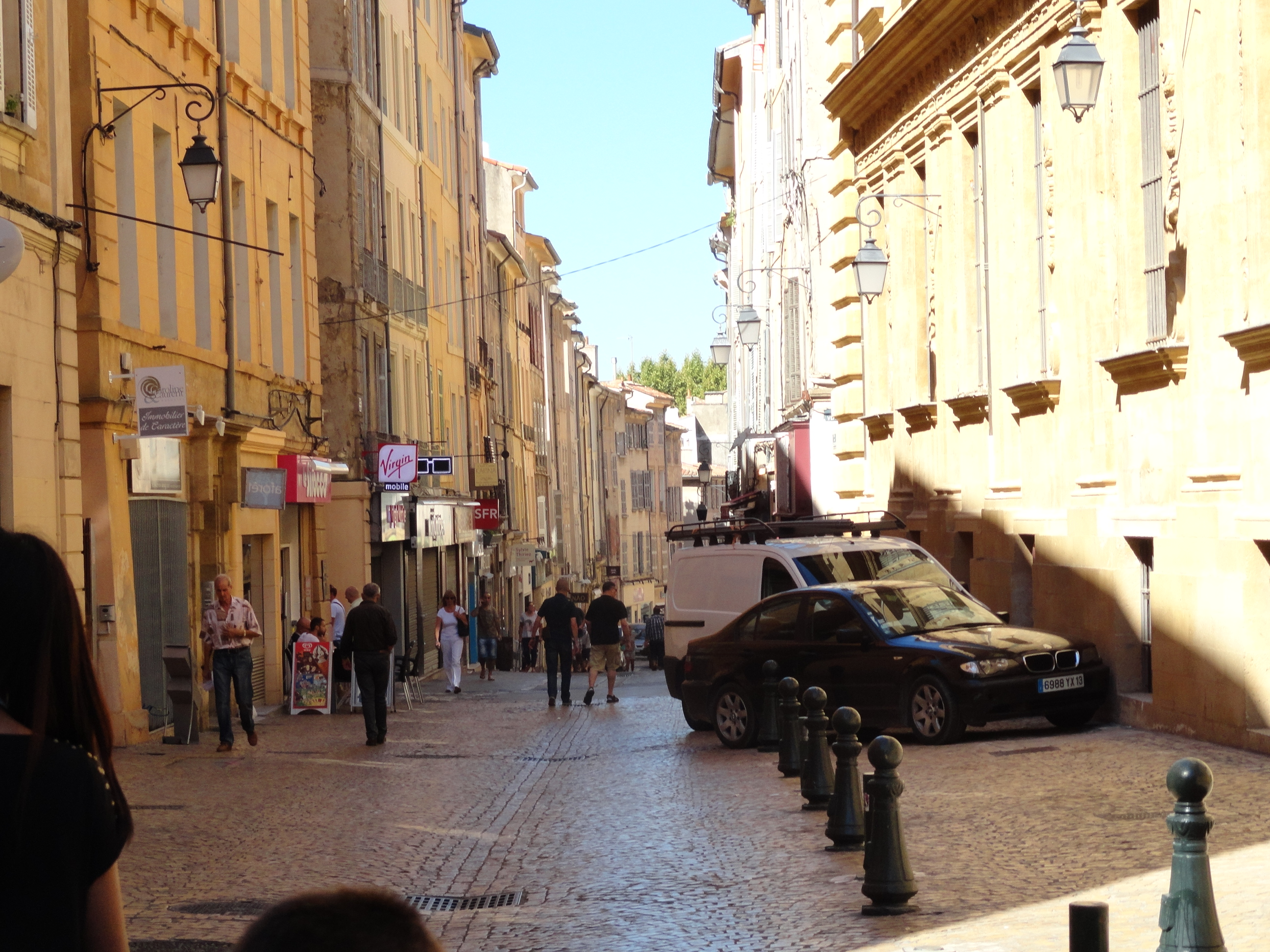
Rue des Cordeliers

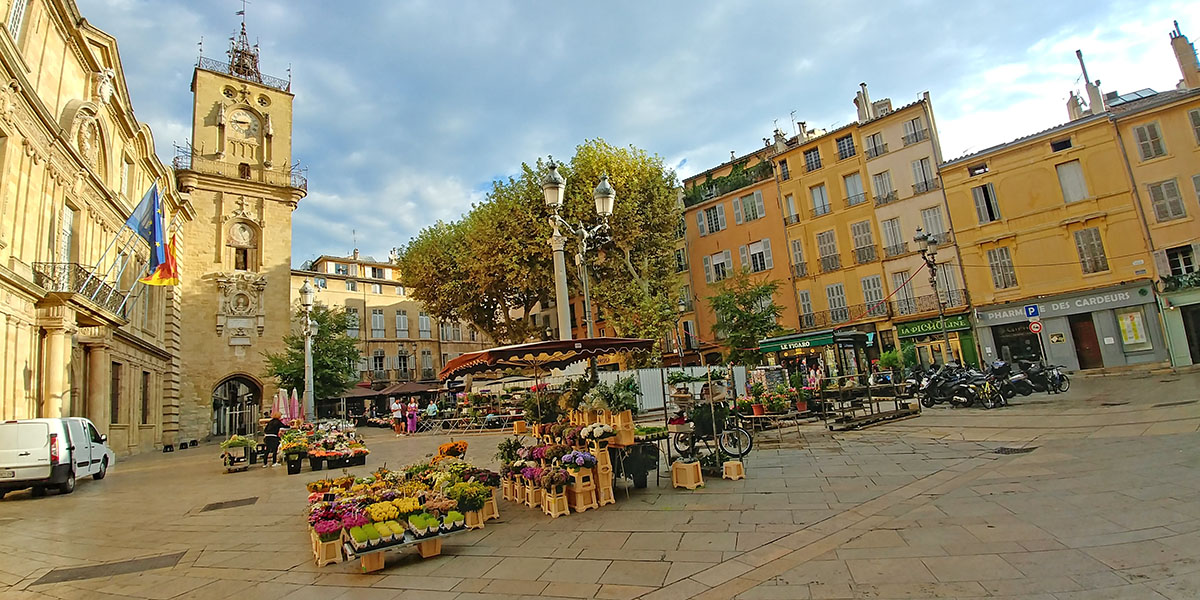
Flower market on Place de l'Hôtel de Ville and the Clock Tower in Aix-en-Provence.

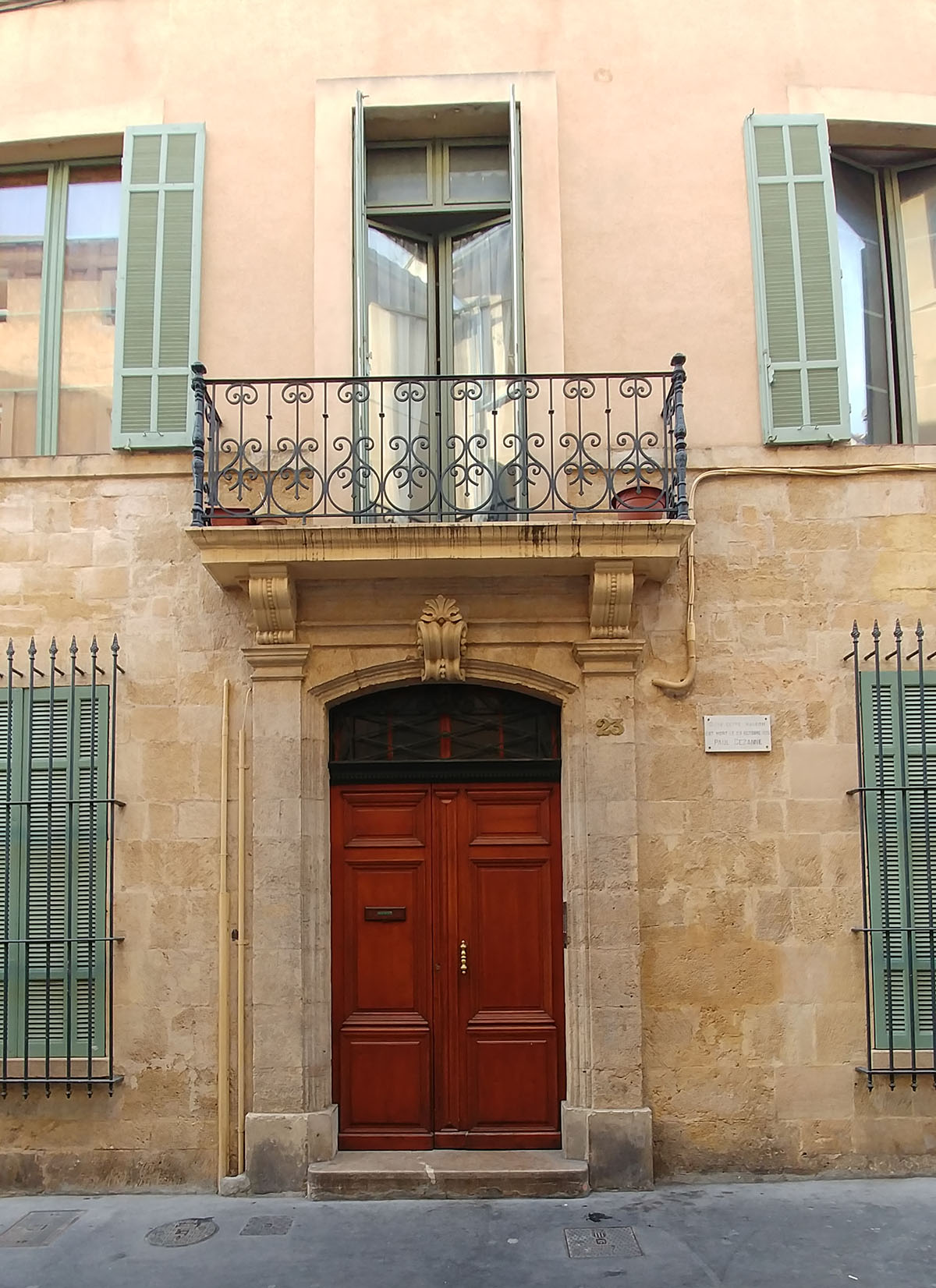
House where painter Paul Cézanne died in 1906 in Aix-en-Provence

== See also ==
- Aix-en-Provence possessions: In 1611, Father Louis Gaufridi was accused of causing demonic possession in the Ursuline nuns at Aix.
- Aurelian Way
- Speech and language laboratory (CNRS)
- List of works by Auguste Carli
- List of works by Louis Botinelly
