= Hôtel de Gantès =

Coordinates: 43.5272°N 5.4505°E

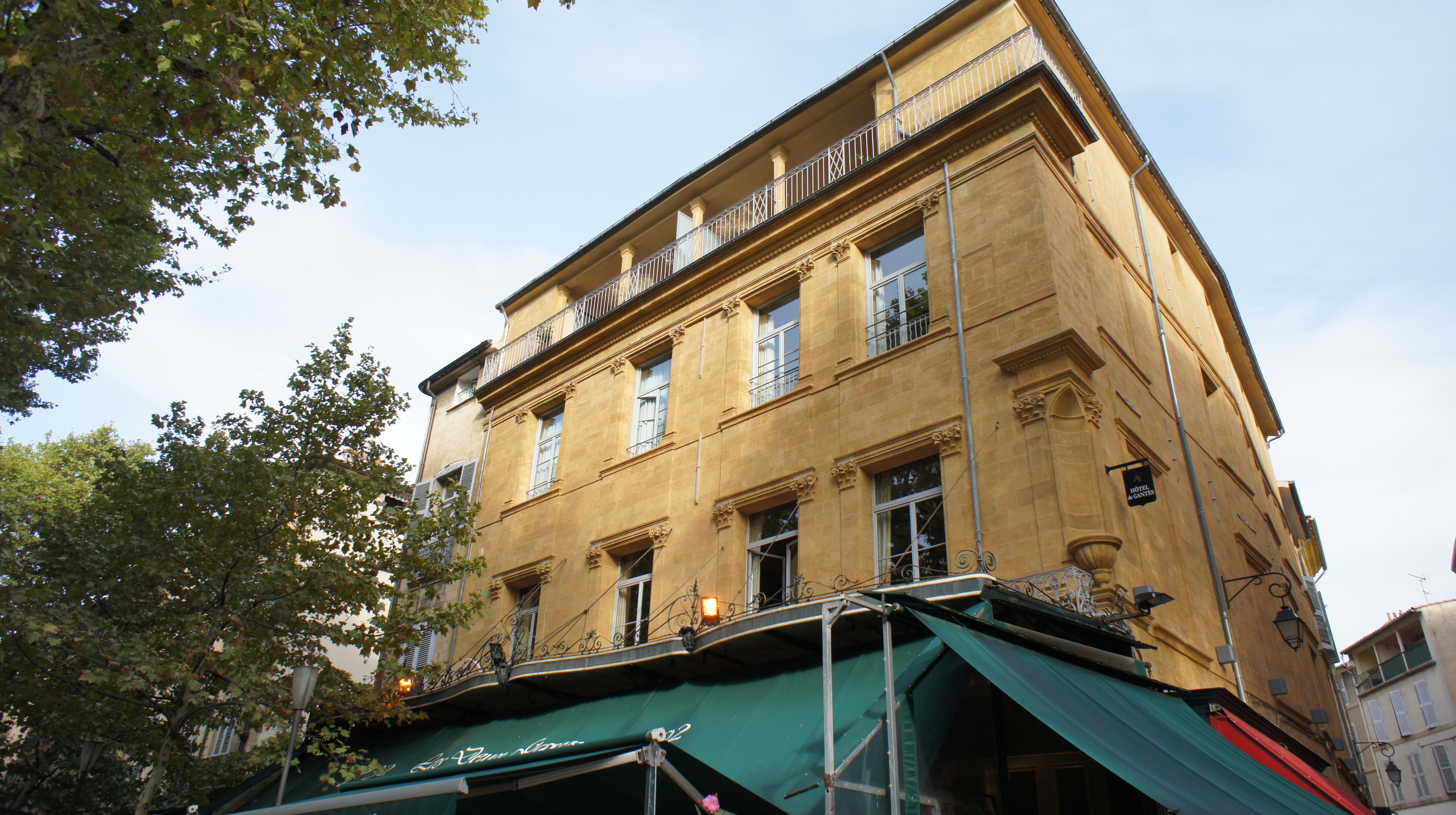
- Interactive map of the Hôtel de Gantès area

General information
- Type: Hôtel particulier
- Location: 53 bis, Cours Mirabeau, Aix-en-Provence, France
- Completed: 1660
- Client: François de Gantès

The Hôtel de Gantès is a listed hôtel particulier in Aix-en-Provence. Built in 1660, it was home to a private members' club until the French Revolution of 1789, when two aristocratic members were murdered (one beheaded, another one hanged) by revolutionaries. Since the 1840s, it has been home to the world-famous café, Les Deux Garçons, a haunt of artists, writers and celebrities.

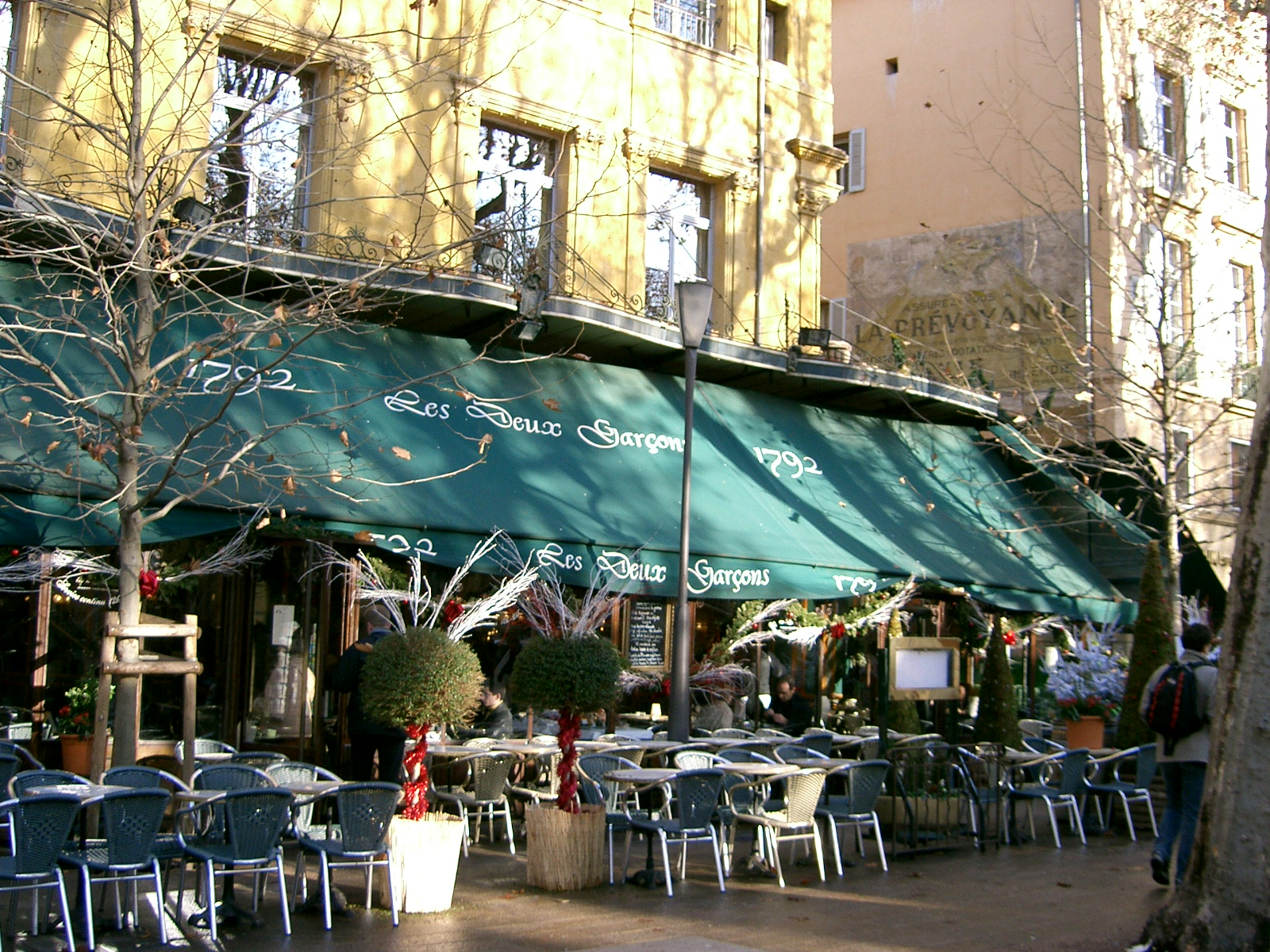
Les Deux Garçons

== Location ==
It is located at 53 bis on the Cours Mirabeau in Aix-en-Provence.

== History ==
According to historian Ambroise Roux-Alphéran (1776–1858), an old barn serving as a hotel, adorned by a white horse, was owned by Antoine Gros in the first half seventeenth century. In 1660, François de Gantès (1596-1679), the General Prosecutor of the Parlement of Aix-en-Provence, purchased it and commissioned the construction of this hotel particulier in its place. In 1716, his grandson Louis-Henri de Gantès sold it to Marc-Antoine d'Albert Duchaine, marquess of Fox-Amphoux, who sold it to Mr Jaubert in 1742.

In 1750, it was purchased by Mr Guion, who started a private member's club on the ground floor called the 'Cercle de Guion'. The club was sympathetic to aristocratic, royalist and so-called counter-revolutionary ideas. Members included Jean-Joseph-Pierre Pascalis (1732-1790) and André-Raymond de Guiramand (1714-1790), who were both murdered during the French Revolution (one was beheaded; the other one was hanged). The club was closed down in December 1790.

In 1792, a café called Café Julien replaced it. In 1823, it was purchased by Mr Guérin.

By 1840, the café became known as Les Deux Garçons, after two men purchased it. The cafe is still there. Over the years, it has been visited by many notable personalities. These have included Raimu, Louis Jouvet, Mistinguett, André Maurois, Winston Churchill, François Sarre, Pablo Picasso, Henri Bosco, Edith Piaf, Blaise Cendrars, Charles Trenet, Alain Delon, Jean-Paul Belmondo, Tino Rossi, Jean Cocteau, and Darius Milhaud. Most notably, Paul Cézanne often spent three hours talking to his friend Émile Zola there before dinner. By 1910, Henri Dobler (1863-1941), who owned the Pavillon Vendôme, described the ground floor as "very run down" due to the presence of the cafe; however, it was later refurnished. In the 1960s, banking heir Rupert Hambro became friends with Picasso in this cafe. More recently, visitors have included Sophie Marceau, Patrick Bruel, Jean Reno, Hugh Grant, George Clooney, etc.

Upstairs, the rooms have been turned into a hotel. It offers eleven rooms and suites.

== Heritage significance ==
It has been listed as a monument historique since 1984.
