= Joseph-Elzéar Morenas =

- Born: August 28, 1776; Saint-Christol, Comtat Venaissin, Papal States
- Died: September 26, 1830 (aged 54); Muri, Principality of Mingrelia, Russian Empire
- Burial place: St. Maximus Monastery, Tsageri, Georgia
- Occupations: Botanist, Orientalist, Spy
- Relatives: Jean-Joseph Rive

Joseph-Elzéar Morénas (August 28, 1776 – September 26, 1830) was a French naturalist, botanist, orientalist, spy, and anti-slavery advocate. His multifaceted career spanned from secret intelligence operations against British colonial expansion in India to pioneering anti-slavery activism during the Bourbon Restoration. Though historically enigmatic and sometimes contradictory, Morénas was notable for his scientific knowledge, linguistic skills, and evolving political convictions.

== Early life and background ==
Born in Saint-Christol-d'Albion in the papal enclave of Avignon (now Vaucluse, France) to Christol Morénas and Louise Mézard from in Apt, his family were Papal Jews (French: Juifs du pape). Morénas initially trained as a goldsmith. He apprenticed with his maternal uncle Rive, a jeweler in Apt and brother of the bibliographer Jean-Joseph Rive, before moving to Carpentras in 1793 and Nîmes in 1797 to perfect his skills in preparation for taking over the family business.

== Career ==
=== Intelligence work in India (1804–1810) ===
In 1798, Morénas broke with his traditional path by moving to Paris. There, through connections with Bordeaux merchants, generals Louis-Gabriel Suchet and César Fauchet, he met general Charles Decaen. Impressed by Morénas's talents and knowledge, Decaen secured him an administrative position in his planned expedition to the East Indies in 1802.

Morénas served as one of Decaen's principal intelligence agents in India amid the declining presence of France in the East Indies after the Treaty of Amiens (1802). Captured by a British frigate and taken to Calcutta in 1804, he managed to secure his release under parole and worked under the cover of a commercial writer employed by a local trading company.

His "Essay on the Current State of India," (French: Essai sur l’état actuel de l’Inde, September 1804) laid out a detailed plan to exploit Britain's strategic vulnerabilities. Morénas promoted a vision of Franco-Indian cooperation, free of racial prejudice, and aligned with the ideals of the French Revolution, and promoted the idea of military intervention supported by local rulers such as the Marathas and Tipu Sultan's successors. He argued that Indian sepoys would abandon the British if faced with a disciplined, ideologically committed French force, especially if bolstered by African soldiers, whom he praised for their resilience and martial capacity.

He particularly supported fostering military and diplomatic ties with Qajar Iran and various Afghan tribal leaders to construct a continental axis of resistance to the British East India Company. His unpublished writings and communications with French officials in Île de France and Paris advocated a coalition stretching from the Ottoman frontier through Persia and Afghanistan to northern India, envisioning a trans-Asian anti-British alignment. Morénas believed that Afghanistan, in particular, could be pivotal due to its geographical position between Persia and India and its historic hostility toward British encroachment. He proposed intelligence-gathering missions and confidential overtures to tribal leaders and Persian officials, although concrete French action on these fronts remained limited by deteriorating maritime power.

In 1805, Morénas was dispatched on a reconnaissance mission to Tranquebar, a Danish settlement, from where he observed and condemned Danish subservience to British interests. When the British captured Tranquebar and neighbouring Serampore, Morénas found refuge at Chandernagore (now Chandannagar, West Bengal). There he resumed his espionage activities while outwardly maintaining the profile of a reclusive scholar focused on botany and linguistics. His intelligence reports emphasized the strategic importance of Chandernagore over Pondicherry for French interests due to its proximity to Calcutta and access to inland waterways.

Despite his efforts, Morénas's vision of a revived French presence in India collapsed with the capitulation of the Île de France in 1810 and the shifting alliances of Napoleon’s continental strategy. Britain consolidated its control, and Morénas returned to France embittered and financially ruined.

=== Scientific and academic pursuits ===
Despite his clandestine activities, Morénas gained recognition in scientific circles as both a botanist and orientalist. After the collapse of France's Indian strategy (1808–1811), he displayed serious scholarly engagement with Indian languages and religions. Morénas developed expertise in Indian languages, especially Hindustani, establishing his reputation as an orientalist. He challenged prevailing misconceptions, asserting it was neither a Persian dialect nor a derivative of Mauritanian tongues, but a distinct and widespread vernacular across northern India. Upon his return to France in 1812, he shared his findings with orientalist Louis-Mathieu Langlès. Although Langlès did not fully credit Morénas's linguistic input, Morénas later published a critical glossary of Langlès's work and defended a more rigorous analysis of Hindustani's reach, grammar and differentiation from Persian, Sanskrit, and regional idioms.

His manuscript "On the Castes of India or Letters on the Hindus" (French: Des castes de l’Inde ou Lettres sur les Hindous, 1822) reflected his deep interest in Hinduism, linguistic structures, and sociocultural practices, especially in response to French orientalist debates back home. He planned an ambitious three-volume Hindustani Dictionary, including a grammar and etymology of over 1,000 Indo-European words tracing back to Sanskrit, but the project remained unpublished due to lack of funding.

In 1814, he unsuccessfully petitioned the Restoration government to create a chair of Hindustani for him.

=== Senegal and anti-slavery activism (1818–1828) ===
In early 1818, Morénas was appointed as an agriculturist-botanist and member of the "Exploration Commission" in Senegal. Shocked by the continuation of the slave trade with the complicity of colonial authorities, he returned to France after only a few months. His subsequent public activism against slavery included two petitions (1820 and 1821) denouncing both slave traders and their official enablers within the French colonial administration. Morénas collaborated with the apostolic prefect of Senegal, Abbé Giudicelly and Henri Grégoire, and exposed that state officials themselves were complicit in the trade. His writings influenced later French legislative reform on slavery. However, this activism cost him his position. He later traveled to Haiti, which strengthened his anti-slavery convictions, before publishing an anti-slavery treatise in 1828 dedicated to Haitian President Jean-Pierre Boyer and three Martinican anti-racist activists, including Cyrille Bissette.

=== Agricultural innovation and proposals ===
After losing government favor for his anti-slavery stance Morénas proposed the naturalisation of tropical crops in southern France. In 1825, he conducted experiments with mulberry meadows in Hyères to yield multiple annual silk harvests. He advocated for the cultivation of indigo, coffee, cotton (particularly Siamese and African varieties), rice, hemp, pistachio, and sugarcane in Provence and Corsica. His broader project, Projet d'une exploitation agricole, envisioned adapting exotic plants to the French climate, but was rejected as utopian. Nonetheless, his practical expertise earned high regard among contemporaries such as Generals Decaen and Lafayette, and intellectuals like Benjamin Constant.

=== In Russia ===
In 1829, General Antoine de Jomini, advisor to Tsar Nicholas I, invited Morénas to develop his botanical experiments in South Caucasus. Soon he was dispatched to the Caucasus by directive of the Russian imperial government, acting under the Minister of Finance Georg Ludwig Cancrin. His mission was to survey economic conditions and propose reforms to agriculture, industry, and trade in the newly conquered Transcaucasian territories. He was granted broad authority to travel, evaluate local conditions, and recommend improvements, particularly in sericulture, viticulture, and the cultivation of colonial crops.

Upon arrival in Caucasus, Morénas encountered systemic resistance to innovation. In official correspondence, he characterised the local population as disinterested in technical advancement, reliant on subsistence farming, and unwilling to participate in market-oriented reforms. He criticised both Armenian and Azerbaijani landowners for neglecting sustainable mulberry cultivation and for their poor rearing of silkworms. Despite this, he praised the raw quality of the cocoons, noting they yielded higher quantities of silk than European counterparts and were more durable in storage. He personally supervised the construction of a European-style reeling facility in Nukha (now Shaki), which produced silk three times more valuable than the local standard. He called for scaling up this model and for ending the destructive tithe levied on mulberry trees.

In viticulture, Morénas found widespread over-irrigation, shallow pruning, and poor vineyard hygiene. He documented rudimentary winemaking techniques and proposed practical measures to improve grape quality, wine preservation, and drying methods for raisins and syrups. He noted that most local wine spoiled quickly due to poor fermentation control and inadequate vessel sealing. He also urged adoption of higher-grade tobacco and cotton seeds, and described wild madder growing across Shirvan, Ganja, and Talysh as a potential export commodity if properly cultivated.

Morénas's writings contain rare references to the treatment of Hindu merchants and labourers in the region, many of whom were engaged in trade along the Caspian coast. He observed that they were subjected to discriminatory customs practices and local extortion, and suggested that their commercial networks could be leveraged more effectively if the imperial authorities extended them basic protections and trade privileges. He was among the few European observers to mention their presence in Ateshgah.

In a memorandum on strategic geography, Morénas assessed coastal defences in the south Caspian. He identified the region around Lankaran and Sara Island as offering strong natural advantages for military fortification. He argued that the shallow waters, island positioning, and dominant view of the approaches from the south provided a valuable defensive frontier against potential incursions from Persia. He recommended constructing a fortified post with access to the local fishing economy and inland trade routes.

He also conducted detailed surveys of the Mingrelian and Imeretian lowlands, recommending extensive deforestation and improved drainage to combat endemic malaria. His proposals to clear underbrush rather than only large trees went against prevailing practices. He advised redirection of settlement and infrastructure to the Khobi and Tsivi rivers, favouring them over the unstable Rioni delta for agricultural development and riverine transport.

Morénas died in Muri, Mingrelia in the residence of David Dadiani on September 26, 1830, likely from cholera. The outbreak of cholera in the region followed shortly after. He was buried near Tsageri on the Tskhenistsqali River, and left his manuscripts, including the unfinished Hindustani dictionary, to general Ivan Paskevich, who later endorsed a pension request for Morénas's sister. His sister received a lifetime pension of 1,200 roubles from the Tsar in recognition of his service. Paskevich stated that Morénas alone had shown what could realistically be expected from the Caucasus in terms of agriculture and industry. His final proposals, though never fully implemented, formed a critical technical record of early imperial Russian developmental ambitions in the Caucasus.

== Political views ==
Morénas's political convictions evolved throughout his career. During his Indian period, he displayed strong republican sympathies with particular affinity for Brissotine Jacobinism, condemning the counter-revolutionary attitudes of French officers who had betrayed their country's interests to serve the British. His anti-imperialism was primarily directed against British expansion, which he characterized as tyrannical and driven by racial prejudice. Notably, he advocated for the federation of Indian indigenous sovereigns as an alternative to British domination, believing that French policy should emphasize generosity and alliance over conquest.

Morénas's anti-slavery stance developed more gradually. While initially advocating for the use of African soldiers ("caffres") in military operations against the British, he later became a principled opponent of the slave trade during his Senegal experience. His 1828 anti-slavery treatise documented his progressive awakening to the injustice of slavery—a personal evolution he attributed to direct observation of colonial practices.

=== Views on Hindu society ===
Morénas approached Hindu society from a deeply critical and anti-colonial perspective shaped by Enlightenment universalism and early humanitarian thought. His time in French India brought him into direct contact with Tamil Hindu communities, whose social structures he studied with both ethnographic interest and moral unease.

Morénas condemned the hierarchical and hereditary caste system as antithetical to natural law and human dignity. He viewed Brahminical dominance as socially corrosive and intellectually stagnant, describing Brahmins as both self-serving and complicit in the perpetuation of what he saw as oppressive customs. In particular, he denounced the ritual exclusion of so-called "impure" castes and the rigid exclusion of women from education and public life. He considered such practices evidence of a society in need of reform but not under European tutelage—instead, he believed moral regeneration should come through internal transformation encouraged by enlightened ideals rather than colonial imposition. His most sustained critique was directed at Hindu religious authority, which he saw as a fusion of superstition and social control. He likened Hindu temples to feudal institutions, with priests functioning as power brokers rather than spiritual guides. At the same time, Morénas admired certain aspects of indigenous moral philosophy and the intellectual traditions embedded in Sanskrit and Tamil literature, though he claimed these had been obscured by what he considered the degeneration of Hinduism over centuries.

Politically, Morénas was hostile to British instrumentalisation of caste divisions, which he believed were manipulated to solidify imperial control. He accused the British East India Company of reinforcing the most reactionary elements of Hindu society to maintain order and extract revenue. His writings criticised both British administrators and European missionaries for failing to understand the complexity of Hindu culture and for imposing Christian frameworks where local ethical traditions might have sufficed. Rather than promoting Christianisation, Morénas advocated for secular education and agrarian reform as tools to transform Hindu society. He championed the redistribution of land held by temples and Brahmin estates to cultivate a class of independent peasant-proprietors, whom he regarded as potential agents of modernisation. His vision aligned with certain proto-socialist ideas that later emerged in 19th-century French republican thought, though his proposals remained largely theoretical.

== Written works ==
- Essay on the Current State of India (French: Essai sur l’état actuel de l’Inde, 1804) – unpublished intelligence report
- Hindustani Dictionary with Grammar and Indian Etymologies – unpublished manuscript
- Petition against the slave trade in Senegal (French: Pétition contre la traite des noirs qui se fait au Sénégal, 1820)
- On the castes of India, or Letters on the Hindus, on the occasion of the tragedy of the Pariah by M. Casimir Delavigne. Followed by notes on the words and customs of India, mentioned in this tragedy. Concluded by critical observations on the notes attached to the translation of Tone's journey among the Mahrattas, and published in the form of a glossary, by M. Langlès, professor of Persian, curator-administrator of oriental manuscripts in the King's library, member of the Institute, etc. (French: Des castes de l'Inde, ou Lettres sur les Hindous, à l'occasion de la tragédie du Paria de M. Casimir Delavigne. Suivies de notes sur les mots et les usages de l'Inde, dont il est fait mention dans cette tragédie. Terminées par des observations critiques sur les notes jointes à la traduction du voyage de Tone chez les Mahrattes, et publiées en forme de glossaire, par M. Langlès, professeur de persan, conservateur-administrateur des manuscrits orientaux de la bibliothèque du Roi, membre de l’Institut, etc., 1822)
- Historical Summary of the Slave Trade and Colonial Slavery (French: Précis historique de la traite des noirs et de l’esclavage colonial, 1828), a 425-page indictment of colonial slavery, accompanied by illustrations and portraits of Martinican abolitionists sentenced to the galleys.

== Source ==
- Courtet, Jules (1997). Dictionnaire géographique, historique, archéologique et biographique des communes du département de Vaucluse. Rediviva (Reprod. en fac-sim. ed.). Nîmes: C. Lacour. ISBN 978-2-84406-051-8.
