= Hôtel de Boisgelin =

Hôtel de Boisgelin may refer to:

- Hôtel de Boisgelin (Aix-en-Provence), a hôtel particulier in Aix-en-Provence, France.
- Hôtel de Boisgelin (Rue de Varenne, Paris), a hôtel particulier at 47-49 Rue de Varenne in Paris, home to the Italian embassy.
- Hôtel de Boisgelin (Rue Masseran, Paris), a hôtel particulier located at 5 Rue Masseran in Paris, sometimes also known as the Hôtel de Richepanse.
- Hôtel de Boisgelin, another named for the Hôtel de Rohan, a hôtel particulier located on the corner of the Rue des Quatre-Fils and the Rue Vieille-du-Temple in Paris.
