= Hôtel de Ville, Aix-en-Provence =

Town hall in Aix-en-Provence, France

Hôtel de Ville
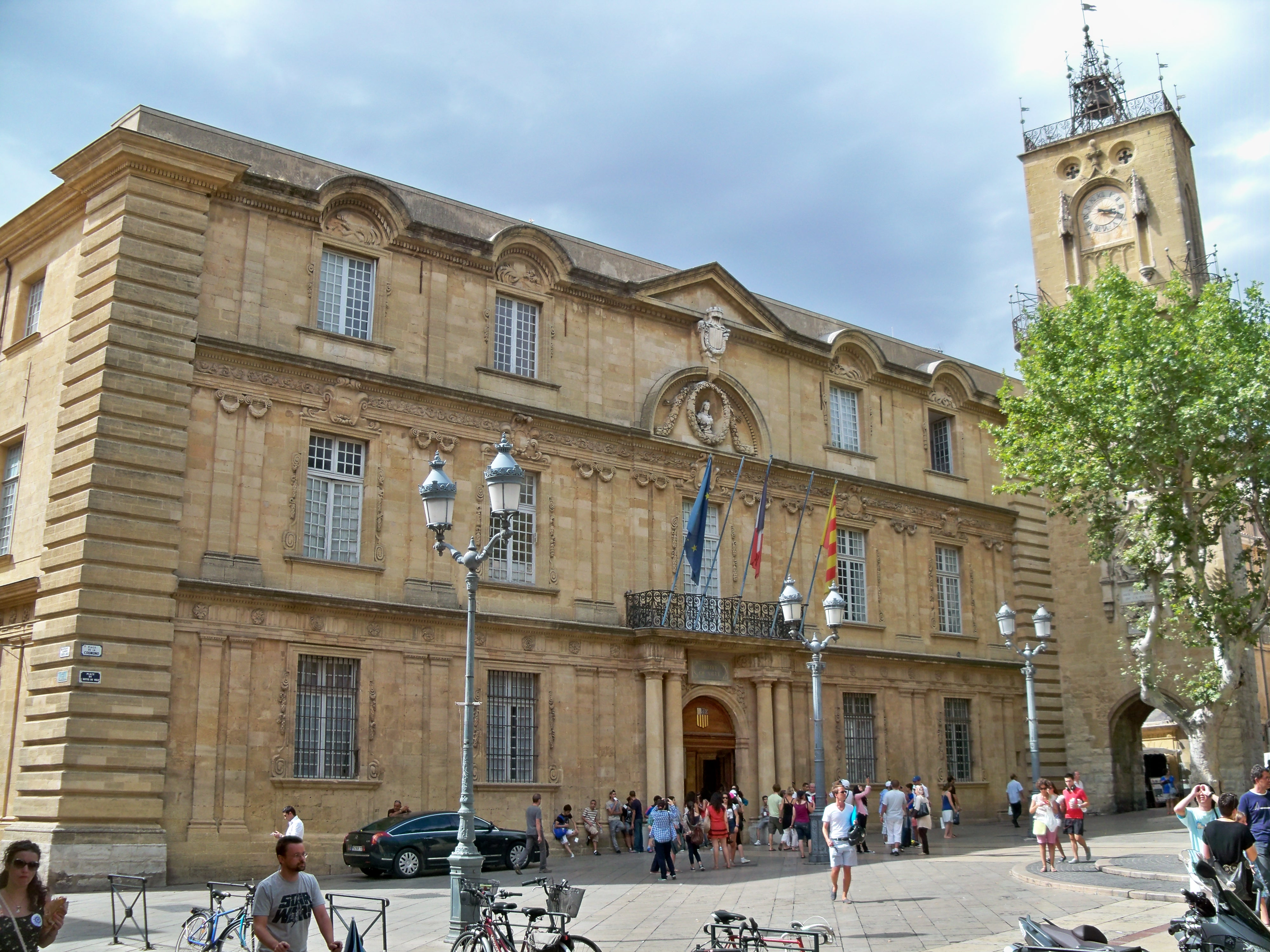
- Main frontage of the Hôtel de Ville in August 2012

General information
- Type: City hall
- Architectural style: Neoclassical style
- Location: Aix-en-Provence, France
- Coordinates: 43.5298°N 5.4475°E
- Completed: 1668

Design and construction
- Architect: Pierre Pavillon

Monument historique
- Official name: Hôtel de ville
- Type: Inscrit
- Designated: 1995
- Reference no.: PA00081058

The Hôtel de Ville (French pronunciation: [otɛl də vil], City Hall) is a historic building in Aix-en-Provence, Bouches-du-Rhône, southern France, standing on Place d'Hôtel de Ville. It was designated a monument historique by the French government in 1995.

== History ==
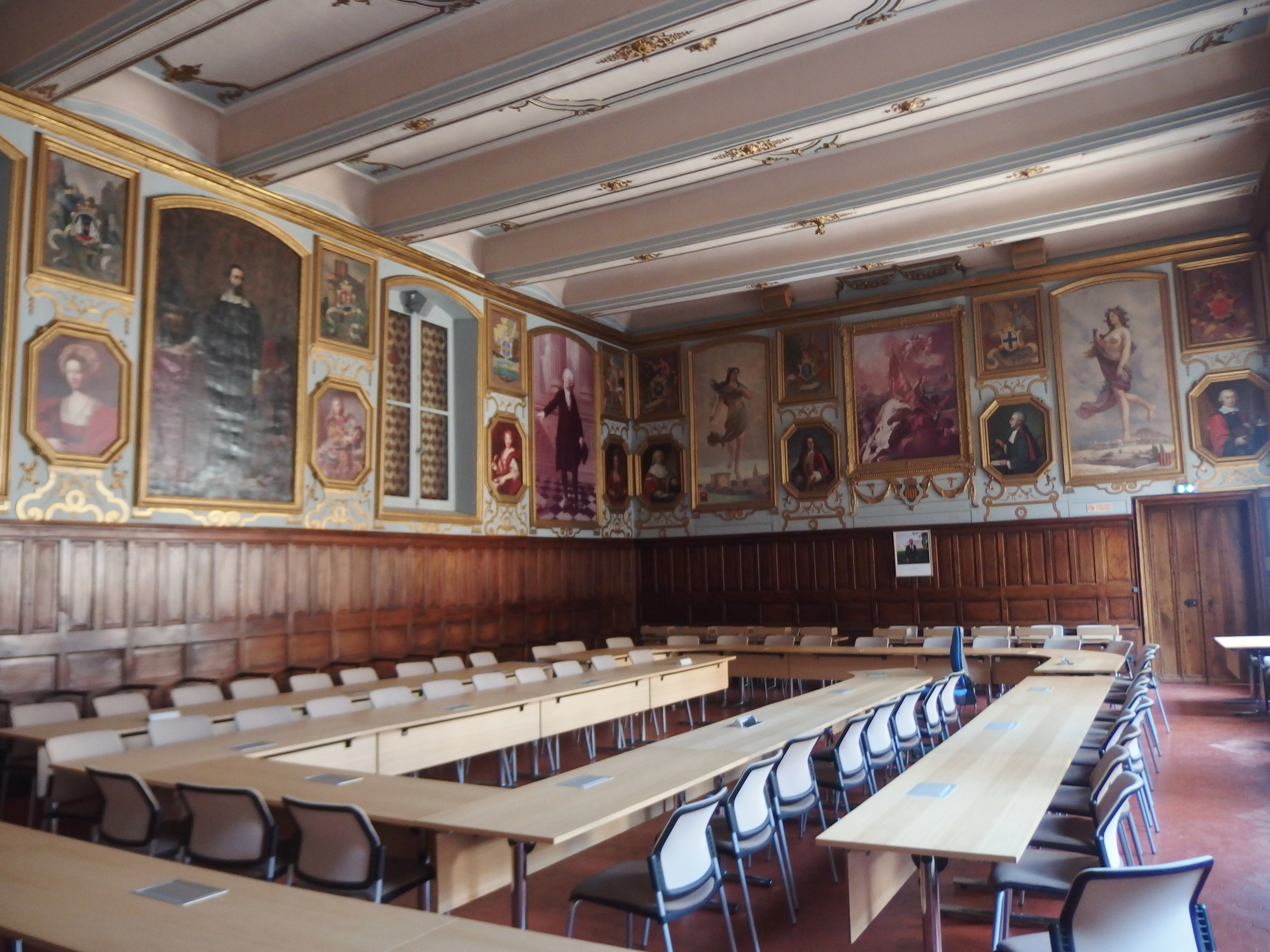
The council chamber

The first town hall in Aix-en-Provence was an ancient structure in the Place de l'Annonerie-Vieille. The city council relocated to the current site on the west side of the town square in 1326. During the Italian War of 1536–1538, the Holy Roman Emperor, Charles V invaded Provence and took Aix-en-Province in August 1536. After the French Army blocked his route, he retreated to Italy and his ally, Charles III, Duke of Savoy ordered the destruction of the town hall as well as the entire municipal archives. After the flames took hold, only a few minute books survived the fire. A clock tower surmounted by a metal frame supporting a bell was installed at the northeast corner of the town hall in 1510, and an astronomical clock was installed in the tower in 1661.

Although the building had been restored in 1538, it was dilapidated by the mid-17th century and, in 1652, the city council decided it should be rebuilt. The new building was designed by Pierre Pavillon in the neoclassical style, built in ashlar stone and was completed in 1668. The design involved a symmetrical main frontage of five bays facing onto the square. The central bay featured a round headed doorway flanked by two pairs of Doric order columns supporting an iron balcony; there was a French door on the first floor and a round arch containing a bust of Louis XIV on the second floor, all surmounted by a pediment. The other bays were fenestrated by casement windows with moulded surrounds, flanked by pilasters supporting a frieze with triglyphs and rosettes above the ground floor, a frieze with scrolls winding in opposite directions above the first floor (in the style of the Maison carrée in Nîmes), and a modillioned cornice broken by round headed pediments containing carvings above the second floor. There were also large statues, sculpted by Jean-Claude Rambaud and Jacques Fossé, depicting Charles of Anjou, Count of Provence and also Louis XI, who succeeded Charles as Count of Province in 1481. The building also featured an inner courtyard with fine carvings on the inner façades.

Internally, the principal room was the Salle des Etats de Provence (Room of the province of Provence) on the first floor. Most of the artwork in this room was entrusted to Joseph Cellony and his son, Joseph André Cellony, and to Louis René Vialy in the early 18th century. A series of portraits depicting the Counts of Province and the Kings of France were subsequently installed in the room.

The two statues were torn down, and the bust was removed and replaced by a bust of Marianne, in August 1792 during the French Revolution, and a fine library bequeathed to the town by Jean-Baptiste Marie de Piquet, Marquess of Méjanes on his death in 1786 was installed on the second floor of the building in November 1810. The roof was refurbished and the façade was restored in October 1868.

Following the liberation of the town by the American 3rd Infantry Division, supported by French Forces of the Interior, on 21 August 1944, during the Second World War, a plaque was placed on the clock tower to commemorate the event. The library was moved to a dedicated building, the Bibliothèque Méjanes, in 1989.

== Sources ==
- Roux-Alpheran, François Ambroise Thomas (1846). Les rues d'Aix ou, Recherches historiques sur l'ancienne capitale de la Provence. Vol. 1. Aubin.
