= Jean-Claude Rambot =

French sculptor and architect

- Born: 1621; Franche-Comté
- Died: 1694 (aged 72–73)
- Occupations: Sculptor; Architect

Jean-Claude Rambot (1621–1694) was a French sculptor and architect.

== Early life ==
Jean-Claude Rambot was born in 1621 in Franche-Comté, then the County of Burgundy in the Holy Roman Empire.

=== Career ===
He became a renowned sculptor and architect in Aix-en-Provence.

As a sculptor, he designed the Fontaine des Quatre-Dauphins in 1667, a fountain listed as a monument historique since 1905. He also designed the Atlas of the Pavillon Vendôme. Additionally, in 1670, he designed the Hôtel d'Arbaud-Jouques, located at 19 Cours Mirabeau and listed as a monument historique since 1990.

=== Death ===
He died in 1694.

=== Legacy ===
- The Parc Rambot, a public park in Aix-en-Provence, is named in his honour.

== Gallery ==
Jean-Claude Rambot
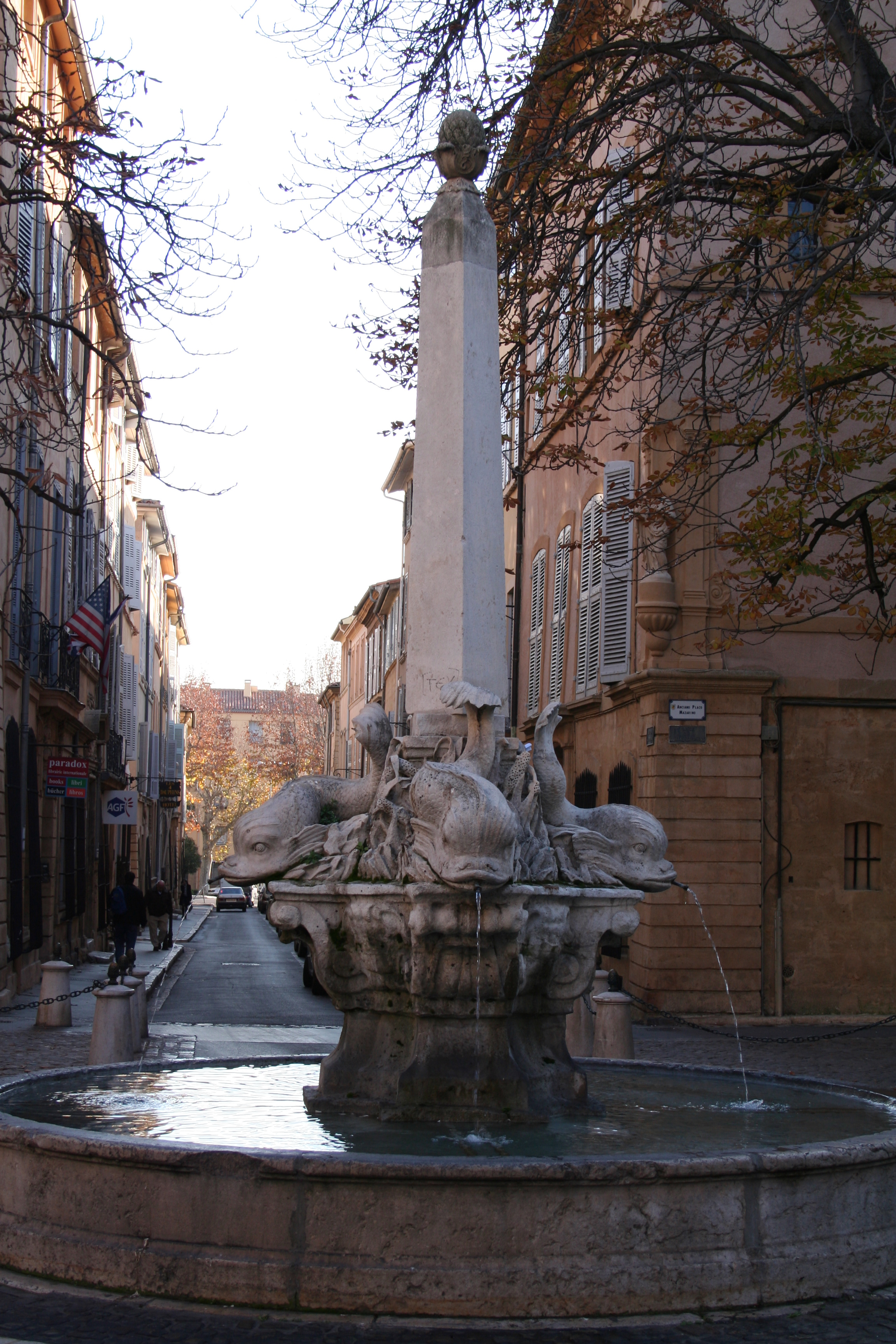
Fontaine des Quatre-Dauphins in Aix-en-Provence

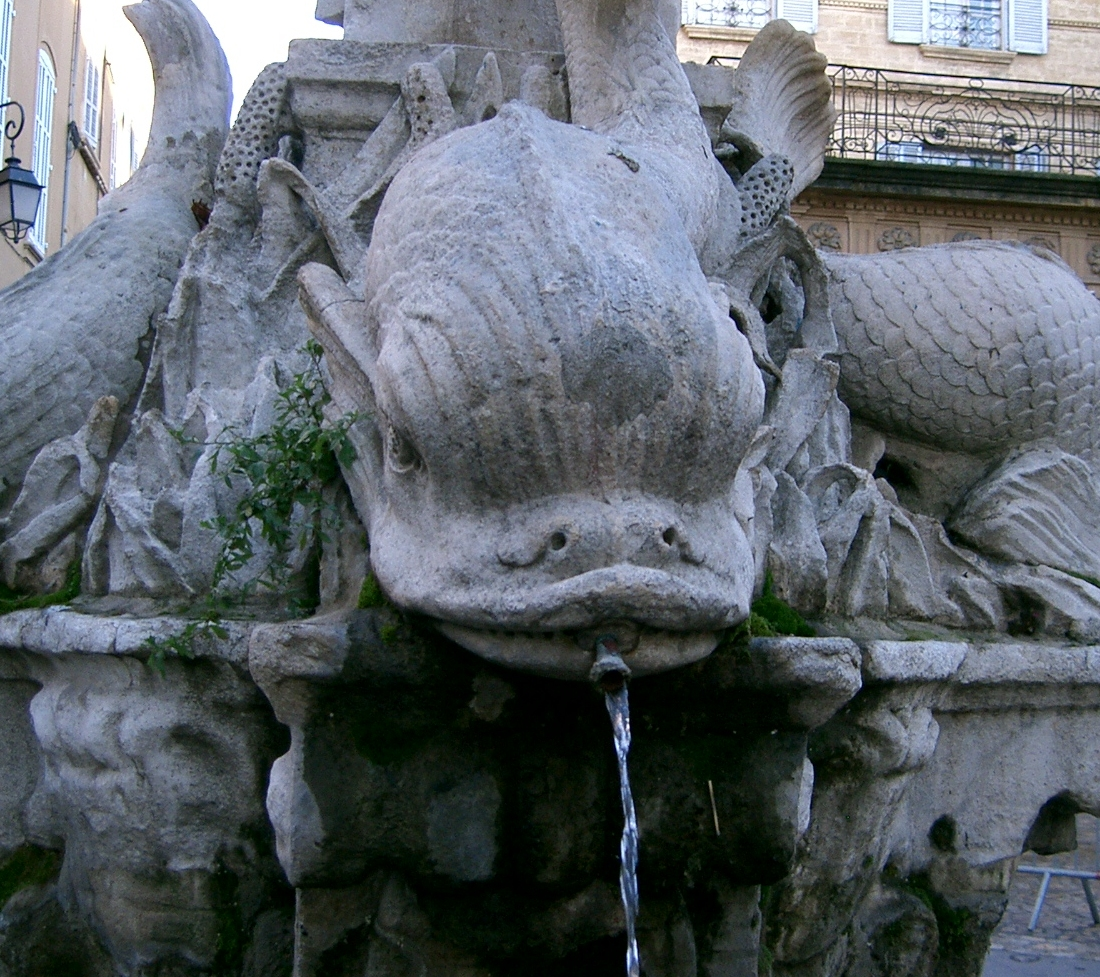
Close-up of the Fontaine des Quatre-Dauphins in Aix-en-Provence

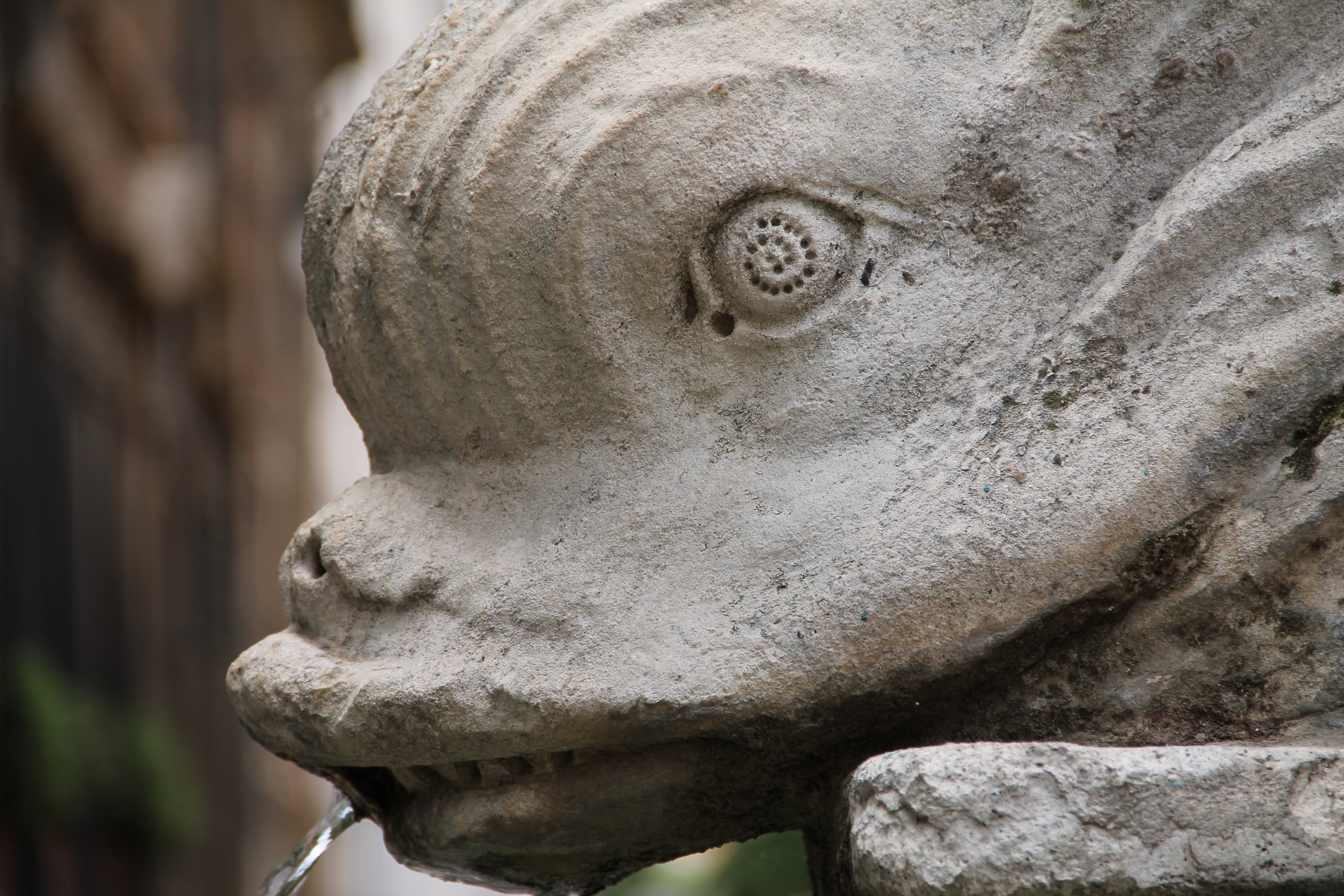
Another close-up of the Fontaine des Quatre-Dauphins in Aix-en-Provence

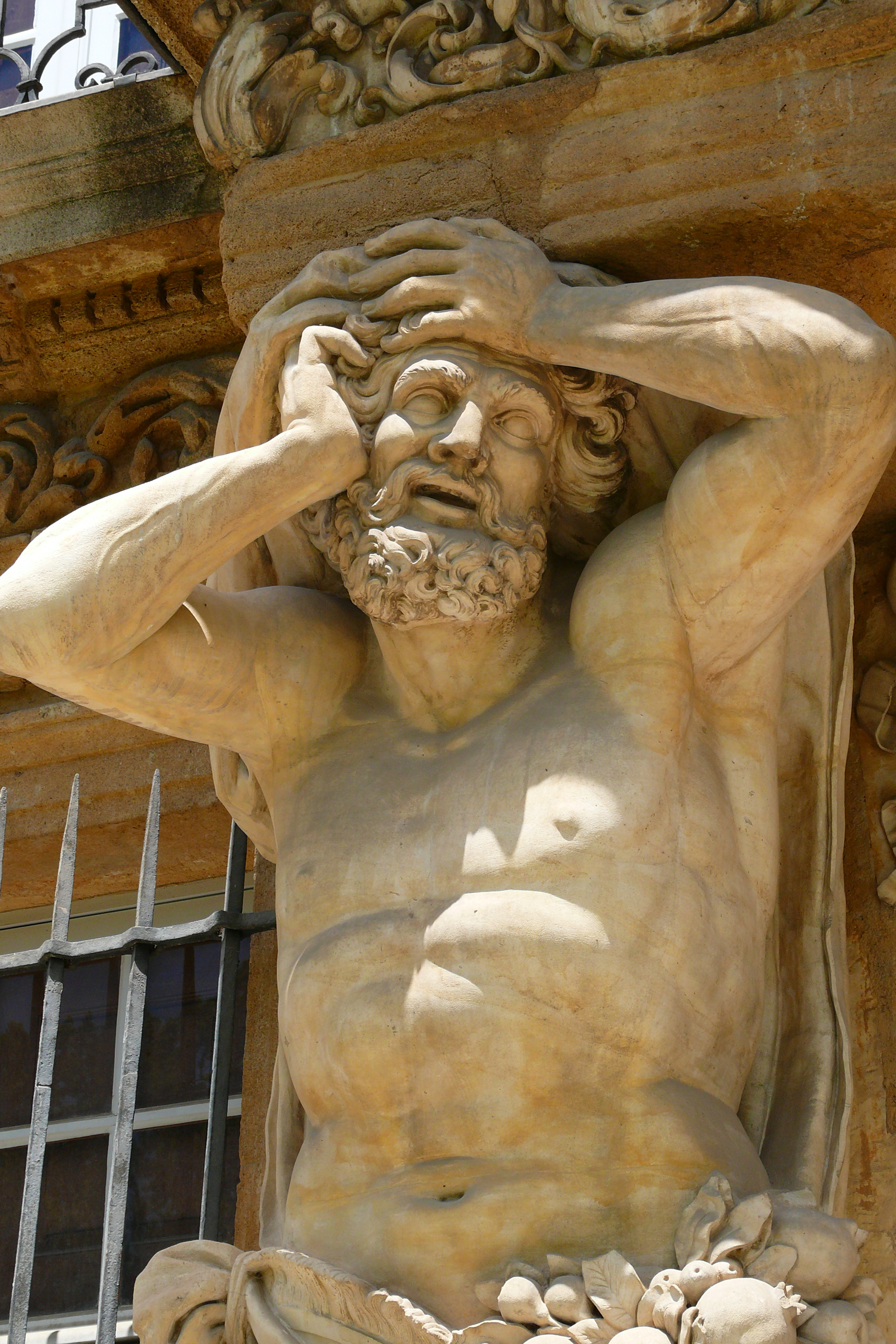
Atlas of the Pavillon Vendôme in Aix-en-Provence

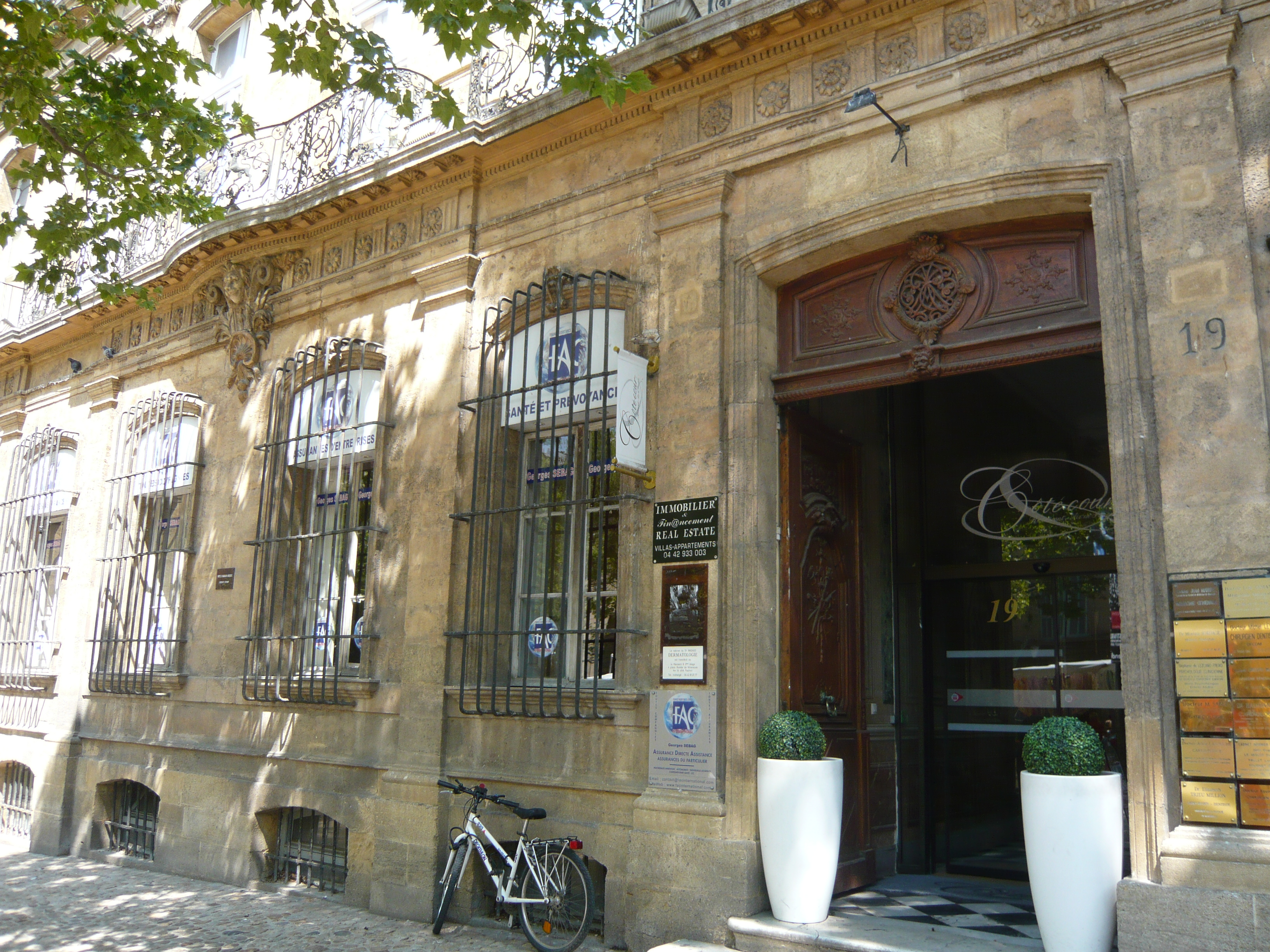
Hôtel d'Arbaud-Jouques on the Cours Mirabeau in Aix-en-Provence
