= Hôtel de Boisgelin (Aix-en-Provence) =

Coordinates: 43.5255°N 5.4504°E

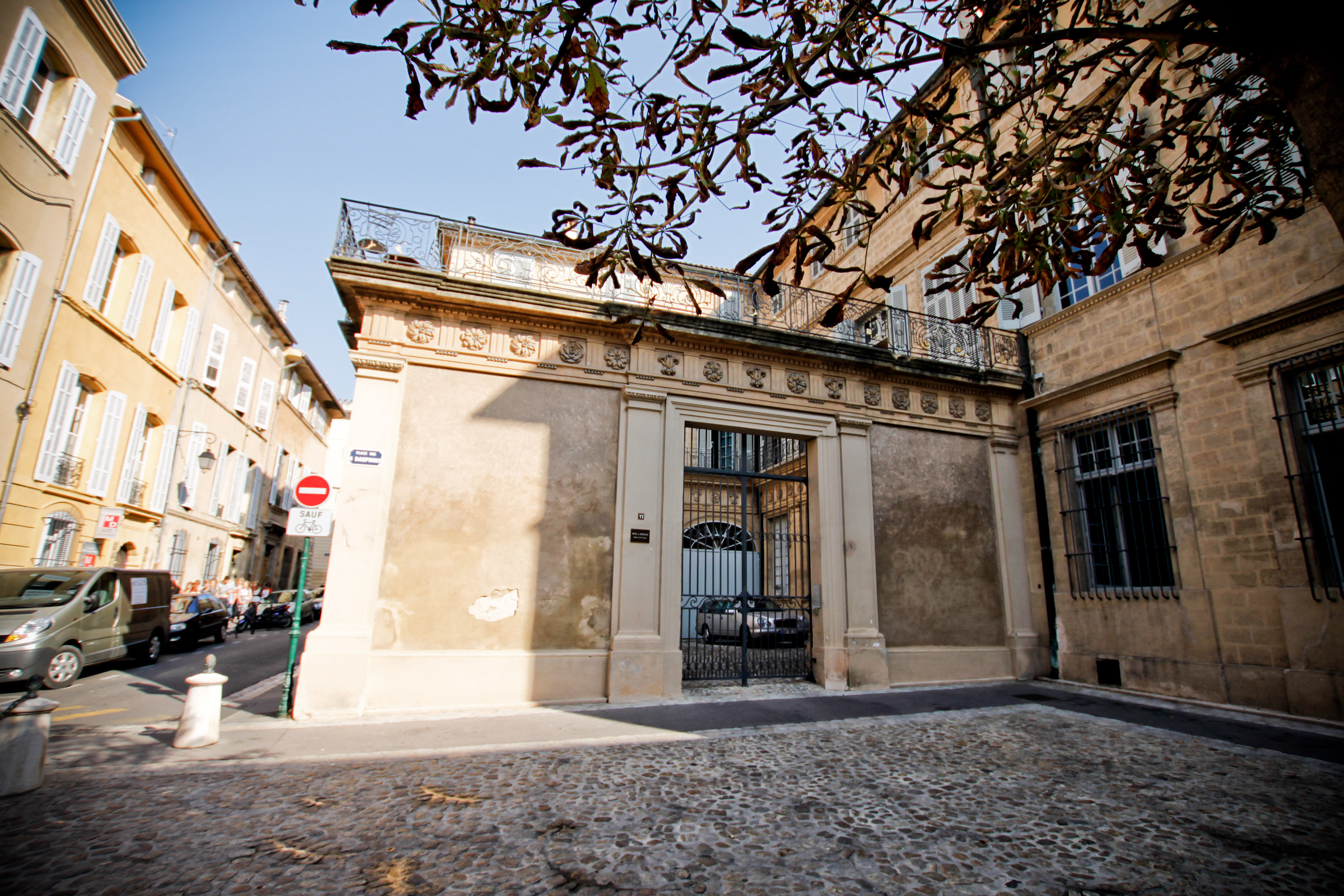
- Interactive map of the Hôtel de Boisgelin area

General information
- Type: Hôtel particulier
- Location: 11 Rue du Quatre-Septembre, Aix-en-Provence, France
- Completed: 1650

Design and construction
- Architects: Pierre Pavillon; Jean-Claude Rambot

The Hôtel de Boisgelin (French pronunciation: [otɛl də bwaʒ(ə)lɛ̃]) is a listed hôtel particulier in Aix-en-Provence, France.

== Location ==
It is located at number 11 on the rue du Quatre Septembre, on the Place des Quatre Dauphins, in the Quartier Mazarin of Aix-en-Provence.

== History ==
It was designed by architects Pierre Pavillon (1612-1670) and Jean-Claude Rambot (1621-1694), and built for Louis Le Blanc de Montespin in 1650. In 1697, it was purchased by Pierre-Joseph Laurens-Brue. That year, he commissioned architect Laurent Vallon (1652-1724) to design a grand staircase inside. It was later inherited by the Boisgelin family.

It comes with a courtyard and a garden. In the garden, there is a fountain under the foliage, thus always in the shade in daytime.

== Heritage significance ==
It has been listed as a monument historique since 1964.
