= Bibliothèque Méjanes =

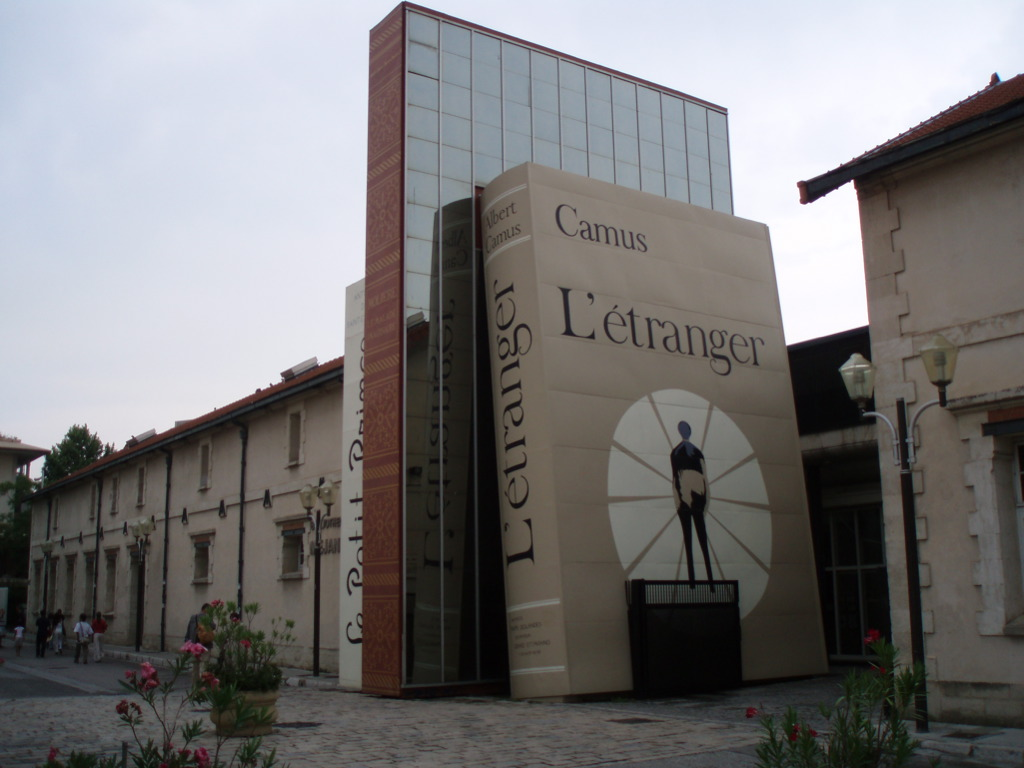
- Interactive map of the Bibliothèque Méjanes area

General information
- Type: Library
- Location: 8-10 Rue des Allumettes, Aix-en-Provence, France, France
- Coordinates: 43.5247°N 5.4393°E

The Bibliothèque Méjanes is the municipal public library of Aix-en-Provence, France. Inaugurated on 16 November 1810 as a part of the Hôtel de Ville (City Hall) of Aix-en-Provence, the library moved into a former match factory in 1989. Since 1993, the library has served as the center of the Cité du Livre, which joins the expansive library, a screening room for independent films, and numerous rooms and workspaces for events. It also houses the Fondation Saint-John Perse and the Association des amis de Jules Isaac.

The archives of the library include medieval works dating to the 12th to 15th centuries, archives of local newspapers from the 19th and 20th centuries, and some 5,500 posters issued between the 17th and 20th centuries. The collections have been protected since 1897.

== Location ==
It is located in the city center of Aix-en-Provence, France, at 8-10 rue des Allumettes.

== History ==
The Bibliothèque Méjanes has its origins in the vast collections of Jean-Baptiste Marie de Piquet, Marquess of Méjanes (1729 - 1786), a huge book lover, who held several posts in administration of Aix-en-Provence during his lifetime. Upon his death in 1786, his will handed over his library of nearly 80,000 volumes to the States of Provence, under the condition that they "maintain an open library in the city of Aix-en-Provence for the benefit of the general public, for which these books will be intended" and by stipulating that the books cannot be lent. The general assembly of Provence quickly accepted the conditions expressed in his will for the legacy of his collections, and appointed an architect, J. A. Raymond, to arrange for a location that could house the new library. In the meantime, the books were transported to the Hôtel de Ville (City Hall) of Aix-en-Provence. The administrators actualized the will of the deceased marquess by identifying and bringing together his collections, which had been until now scattered amongst his numerous properties. These collections were consolidated temporarily at the City Hall of Aix-en-Provence while Raymond searched for a permanent building.

During the French Revolution (1789 - 1799), libraries in France became revolutionary stockrooms. However, the growing library of the former marquis of Méjanes remained protected at Aix-en-Provence City Hall.

The library opened to the public in 1810. It was located in three large rooms on the second floor of the City Hall. Its collections broadened in the nineteenth century from the commitment of the state to cultural preservation and expansion, but also from generous donations from individuals: those of Dr. Baumier, Auguste Pecoul, and donations smaller in number that nonetheless contributed to the expansion of the collections.

In the twentieth century, the library experienced periods of prosperity, but also periods of desertion: in the inter-war period, Pol Neveux, French general inspector of libraries, came every year to the library to help with its maintenance and to at the least ensure that the broken windows were replaced. The Bibliothèque Méjanes remained at City Hall until 1989. It then moved into a closed match factory, which was named the Cité du Livre four years later. Since, the library has focused on developing their resources and location for the benefit of the public.

== Librarians ==
The library collection was started with a bequest from the estate of Jean-Baptiste Marie de Piquet, Marquess of Méjanes, and its first librarian was Jean-Joseph Rive. Since, the librarians of the Bibliothèque Méjanes have been:

- Jean-Joseph Rive (1730 – 1791), first librarian, named 26 December 1786.
- Jacques Gibelin (1744 – 1828), named 3 November 1792, protecting the library during the French Revolution.
- Jean Diouloufet (1771 – 1840), named 4 February 1828.
- The archaeologist Étienne Rouard (1792 – 1873), named 23 September 1830.
- The poet Jean-Baptiste Gaut (1819 – 1891), named in September 1870.
- Louis Mouan, named 1 January 1872, elected lifelong secretary of the Académie française for science, agriculture, art, and the belles-lettres of Aix-en-Provence.
- Jean-Baptiste Gaut, renamed 1 May 1878.
- Barthélemy Pust (1842 – ?), named 14 July 1891.
- The poet François Vidal (1832 – 1911), named 18 August 1896.
- Édouard Aude (1868 – 1941), named 1 March 1897.
- Bruno Durand (1890 – 1975), named 1 February 1936.
- Annick de Kerversau (1904 – 1994), named 13 November 1958, knight of the National Order of Merit on 24 June 1964.
- Suzanne Estève, named in 1973.
- Xavier Lavagne d’Ortigue, named 1 October 1982.
- Danièle Oppetit, named 1 May 1991.
- Gilles Eboli, named 1 September 1998.
- Corinne Prévost, named 1 January 2009.
- Rémy Borel is the current librarian, since 2013.

== Network ==
This library of about 96,000 square feet is the central point of a public reading network which has three annexes. The library has also managed a "bibliobus" since 1995 which services districts far from the city center, to make available books, newspapers, and videos to those without convenient access to the library.

The library is fully accessible for people with reduced mobility or visual impairment, achieved through equipment for reading and Internet use: a tele-magnifying machine, a reading machine, and computer and adapted software.

== See also ==
- List of libraries in France

== Bibliography ==
- Un cabinet d’amateur au xviii^{e} siècle : le marquis de Méjanes bibliophile, catalogue de l’exposition, notices rédigées par Jean-Marc Chatelain, Aix-en-Provence, Cité du Livre, Paris, Association internationale de bibliophilie, 2006.
- Gilles Eboli, « La Cité du Livre d’Aix-en-Provence », Bulletin des bibliothèques de France, 45, n^{o} 5, 2000, p. 72-77 en ligne [archive], consulté le 20 mars 2008.
- Jacques Gibelin, Observations sur la bibliothèque Méjanes…, 1790.
- Jacques Gibelin, Détail historique et observations sur la bibliothèque Méjanes, Aix-en-Provence, Gibelin-David et Émeric-David, 1793.
- Marquis de Lagoy, Lettre à M. le maire d’Aix au sujet du prêt des livres de la bibliothèque Méjanes formellement interdit par le donateur et autorisé par un arrêté municipal du 1^{er} décembre 1847, par le Marquis de Lagoy représentant le Marquis de Méjanes, son grand-oncle, Aix, A. Makaire, 1873.
- Xavier Lavagne, « Le marquis de Méjanes et ses livres », dans Histoire des bibliothèques françaises. 2. Les bibliothèques sous l'Ancien Régime 1530–1789, sous la direction de Claude Jolly, rééd, Paris, éd. du Cercle de la Librarie, 2008, p. 334–338.
- Raphaële Mouren, « La bibliothèque Méjanes : Le legs du marquis de Méjanes et de ses conséquences », dans Je lègue ma bibliothèque à... dons et legs dans les bibliothèques, éd. Raphaële Mouren, Meolans Revels, Atelier Perrousseaux, 2010 (Kitab Tabulae).
- Danièle Oppetit, « La bibliothèque Méjanes », Patrimoine des bibliothèques de France, [Paris], Banque CIC pour le livre, consulté le 18 mars 2010.
- Ulysse Robert, « Introduction », dans Ministère de l’Instruction publique et des Beaux-Arts, Catalogue général des manuscrits des bibliothèques publiques de France : départements, t. 16, Aix-en-Provence, par M. l’abbé Albanès, Paris, librairie Plon, 1894.
- Étienne Rouard, Notice sur la bibliothèque d’Aix, dite de Méjanes; précédée d’un essai sur l’histoire littéraire de cette ville, sur ses anciennes bibliothèques publiques, sur ses monuments, etc. [archive], Paris, Firmin Didot frères et Treuttel et Wurtz / Aix, Aubin, 1831, 312 p..
- Jean Stouff, « Les bibliothèques publiques d'Aix-en-Provence au xviii^{e} siècle », Annales du Midi, 239, juillet–septembre 2002, p. 293–317.
