= Hôtel de Forbin =

Coordinates: 43.5264°N 5.4484°E

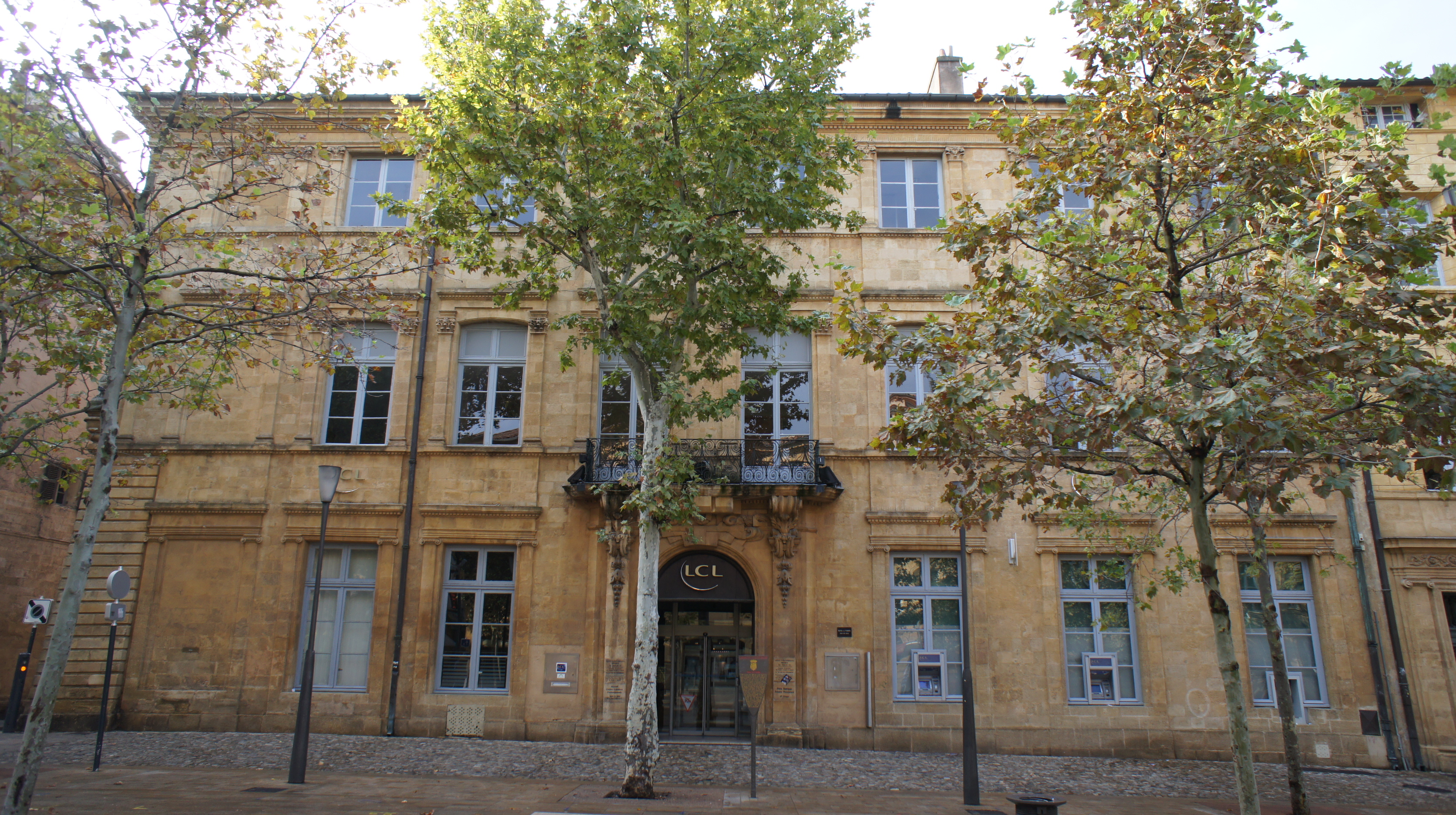
- Interactive map of the Hôtel de Forbin area

General information
- Type: Hôtel particulier
- Location: 20, Cours Mirabeau, Aix-en-Provence, France
- Completed: 1656

Design and construction
- Architect: Pierre Pavillon

The Hôtel de Forbin is a listed hôtel particulier in Aix-en-Provence.

== Location ==
It is located at 20, Cours Mirabeau in Aix-en-Provence.

== History ==
It was designed by architect Pierre Pavillon (1612-1670) in 1656. It was built for César de Milan, who served as a legal advisor to the Parlement of Aix-en-Provence. In 1672, it went to the Forbin family thanks to a marriage.

Pauline Bonaparte (1780–1825) was a visitor in 1807, as was Joseph Fouché (1759-1820) in 1810.

It now houses the LCL S.A. bank.

== Heritage significance ==
It has been listed as a monument historique since 5 November 1990.
