= Maison du Figaro =

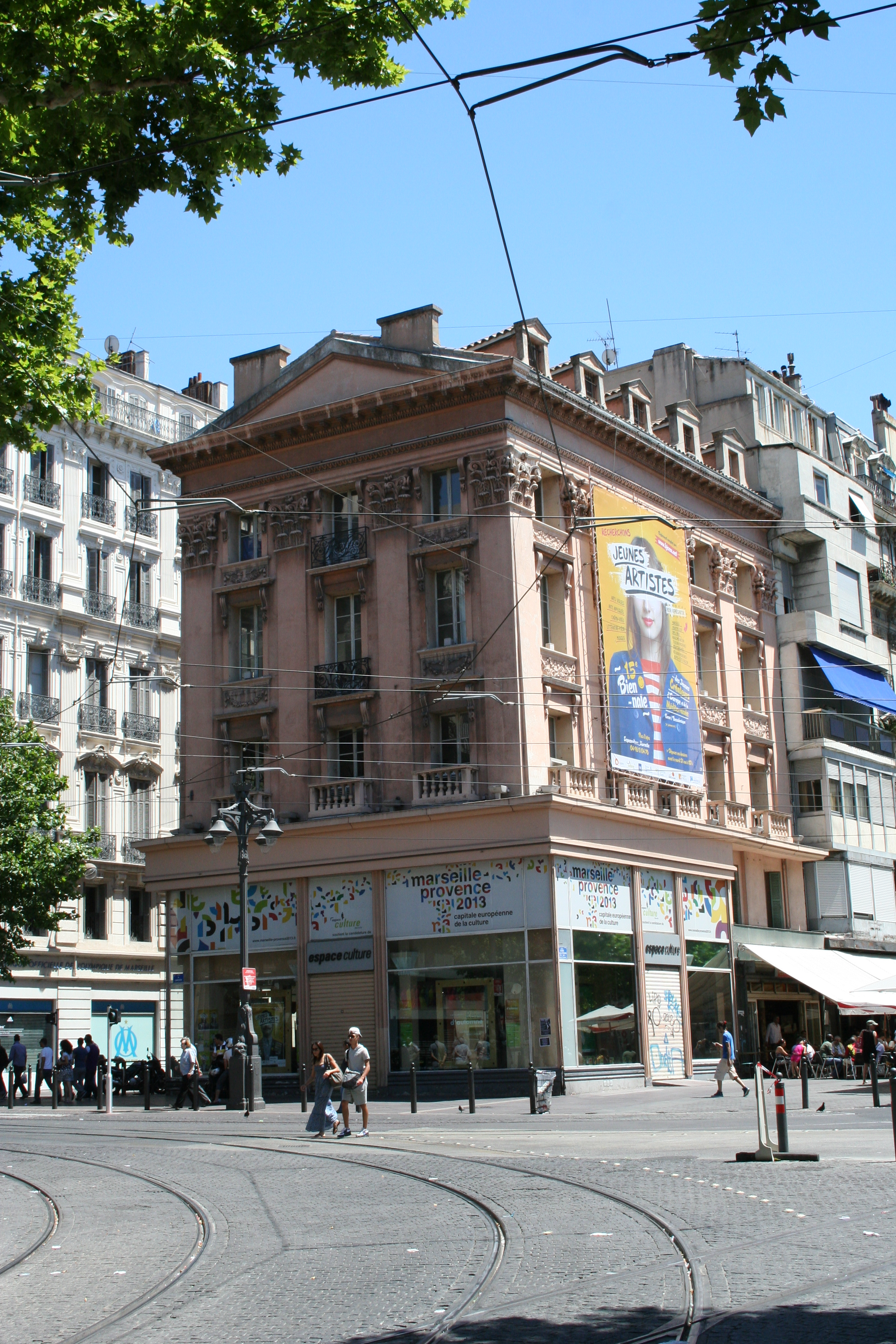
- Interactive map of the Maison du Figaro area

General information
- Type: Building
- Location: Marseille, France
- Coordinates: 43°17′47″N 5°22′42″E
- Completed: 1675

Design and construction
- Architect: Pierre Pavillon

The Maison du Figaro is a historic building in the 1st arrondissement of Marseille in France. It was designed by architect Pierre Pavillon, and it was completed in 1675. It has been listed as an official historical monument since 1992.
