= François de Gantès =

French aristocrat, landowner and military commander

- Born: 1596
- Died: 1679 (aged 82–83)
- Occupations: Landowner; Military commander

François de Gantès (1596-1679) was a French aristocrat, landowner and military commander.

== Biography ==
=== Early life ===
François de Gantès was born to an aristocratic family in 1596. His father, Jacques de Gantès (1567-1631), was Lord of Valbonnette.

=== Career ===
He inherited the Lordship of Valbonnette from his father.

He served as a military commander and adviser to King Louis XIV (1638-1715). He also served as a General Prosecutor in the Parlement of Aix-en-Provence from 1634 to 1674.

=== Personal life ===
In 1634, he married Jeanne de Croze de Lincel (unknown-1681). They had four children:

- Jean-François de Gantès.
- Michel de Gantès.
- Françoise de Gantès.
- Gabrielle de Gantès.

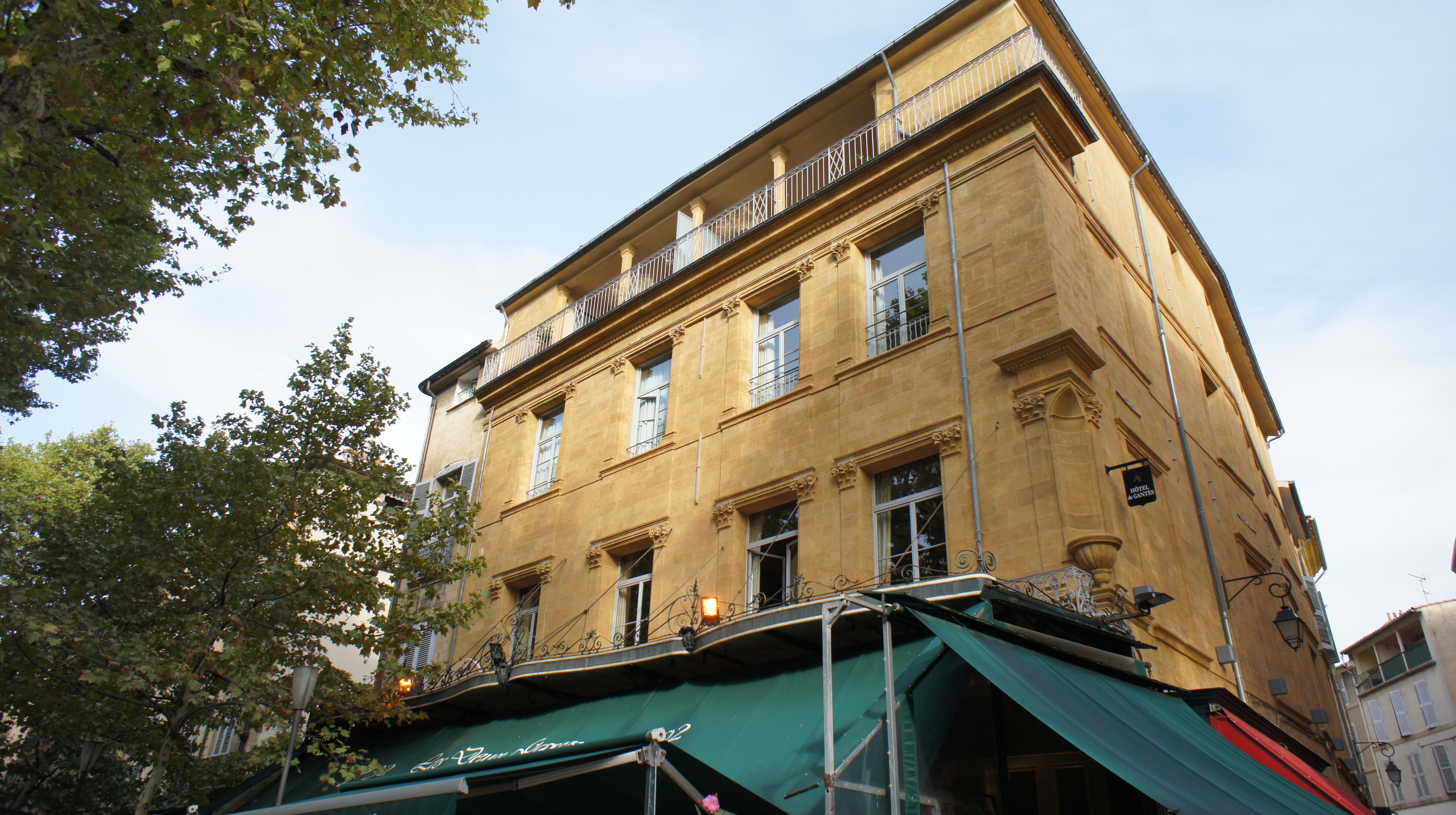
Hôtel de Gantès in Aix-en-Provence

In 1660, he commissioned the construction of the Hôtel de Gantès, a hôtel particulier located at 53 bis on the Cours Mirabeau in Aix-en-Provence. It is now listed as a monument historique.

He died in 1679.
