= Jean-Joseph Rive =

French librarian (1730–1791)

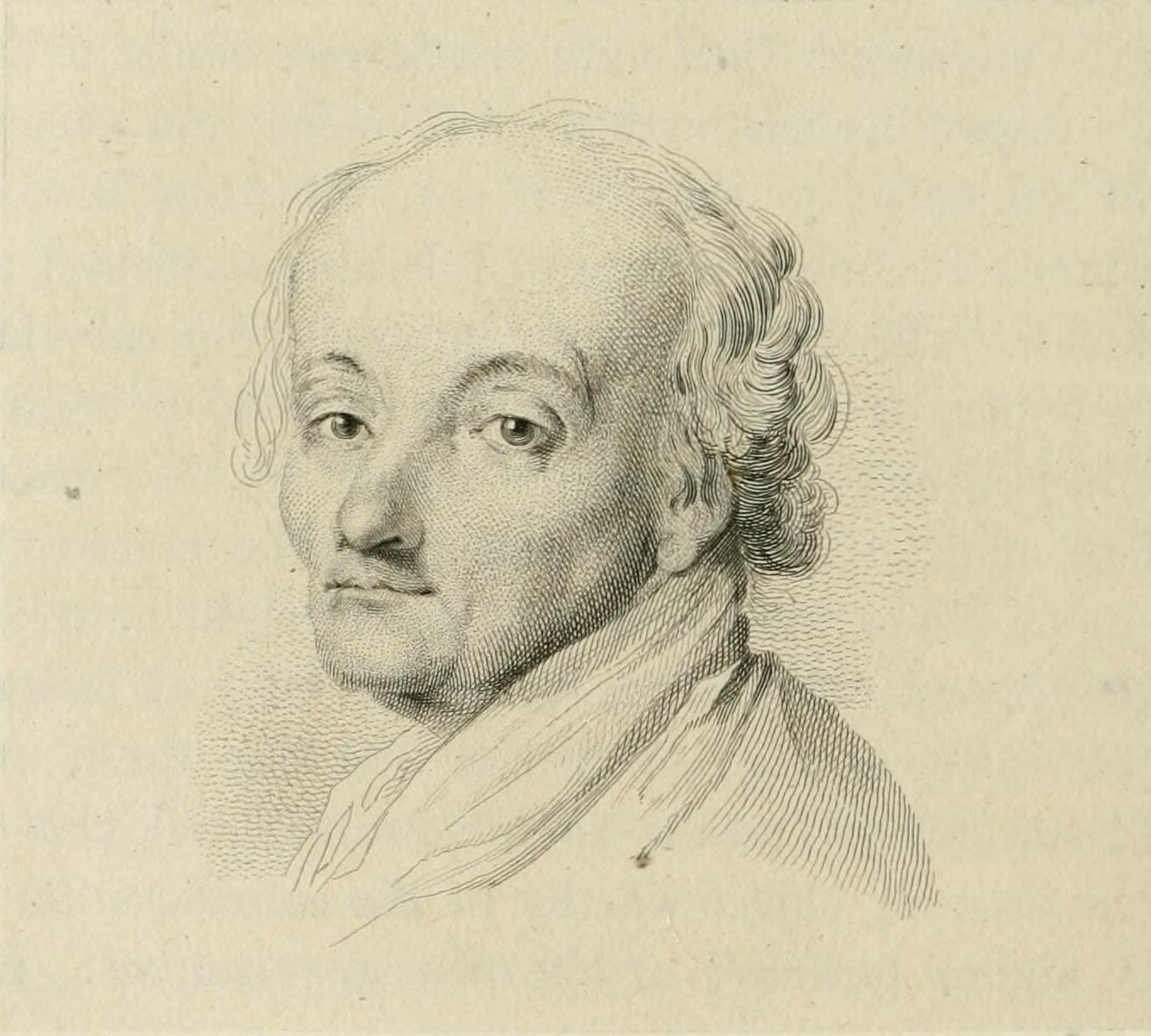
- Born: 19 May 1730; Apt, France
- Died: 20 October 1791 (aged 61); Marseille, France
- Occupations: Librarian; Bibliographer

Jean-Joseph Rive (French pronunciation: [ʒɑ̃ ʒozɛf ʁiv]; 19 May 1730. – 20 October 1791) was an 18th-century French bibliographer, librarian and revolutionary leader.

== Biography ==
The son of a goldsmith, abbot Rive was gifted with a vast memory, a penetrating mind and the immense erudition that can give an infinite reading. He began to raise his literary treasures barely fourteen years old. After embracing the ecclesiastical state, he first taught philosophy at St. Charles College of Avignon.

He then resigned in 1767 the cure of Mollégès which he had been provided, and came to live in Paris. The following year he became librarian of the Duke de la Valliere, a position he held until the death of the Duke in 1780, who bequeathed him 6000 pounds. Although he increased the library which he had charge of with large number of rare and valuable books, he did not participate in drafting the catalog of the collection for the duchess of Châtillon, heir to the Duke of La Valliere commissioned Debure and Vanpraet to catalog the rare books of the library. This preference offended Rive who revenged himself by bitter criticisms against the two scientists. His pride and his irascible and annoying nature quarreled with those caring like him of bibliography, and whom he stigmatized with insulting epithets, to the point that his career was punctuated by continual disputes and debates, even if he was said to have been, in his interior, good parent and friend, and excellent master.

When the Marquis de Méjanes bequeathed a considerable library to the États de Provence, the archbishop of Aix proposed, on behalf of his fellow Provençaux, that abbot Rive be the librarian of the bibliothèque Méjanes. Rive accepted this post, but his exorbitant claims gave rise to endless disputes, that his presence at Aix, where he had returned, made even more difficult to close. Meanwhile, the Révolution broke out and put an end to this project.

Abbot Rive then founded in the Provençal capital, the faction of the Frères Anti-Politiques (Anti-Political Brethren), gathering little people who were sowing terror. Their misdeeds lead to the riots of December 1790 in Aix-en-Provence in which was notably murdered lawyer Jean Pierre Joseph Pascalis, of which Rive was even accused of causing death. No one knows where he would have stopped had he not died in 1792 of a stroke at age 62.

== Selected publications ==
- 1770: Lettres philosophiques contre le Système de la nature, Portefeuille hebdomadaire de Bruxelles.
- 1790: Lettre vraiment philosophique.
- 1791: Au trés-integre et au trés-respectable tribunal judiciaire de Marseille.
- 1793: Chronique littéraire des ouvrages imprimés et manuscrits de l’abbé Rive, Imp. des" Anti-Copet.
- 1780: Eclaircissements historiques et critiques sur l’invention des cartes à jouer, François-Ambroise Didot, Paris.

== Bibliography ==
- Moureau, François (2002). "L'abbé Rive ou l'homme-bibliothèque : une " physiologie " provençale". Babel. No. 6. Université de Toulon et du Var. pp. 105–125. ISSN 1277-7897.
- Dominique Varry, "Les morsures du 'dogue' du duc de La Vallière", dans Gilles Bertrand, Anne Cayuela, Christian Del Vento, Raphaële Mouren, dir., Bibliothèques et lecteurs dans l'Europe moderne, (XVII^{e}-XVIII^{e} siècle), Genève, Droz, 2016.

== Sources ==
- François-Xavier de Feller, Biographie universelle ou Dictionnaire historique des hommes qui se sont fait un nom, vol.VII, Paris, Gaume frères, 1850, (p. 257).
