= Pierre Pavillon =

French architect and sculptor (1612–1670)

- Born: 20 February 1612; Paris, France
- Died: 24 November 1670 (aged 58); Aix-en-Provence, France
- Occupations: Architect; Sculptor

Pierre Pavillon (French pronunciation: [pjɛʁ pavijɔ̃]; 20 February 1612 – 24 November 1670) was a French architect and sculptor.

== Biography ==
=== Early life ===
Pierre Pavillon was born on 20 February 1612 in Paris to Henri Pavillon (unknown–1651), a painter, and Marguerite Guilheme. He had two brothers: Claude, a painter, and Henri, a sculptor. He was trained as an architect in Paris from 1625 to 1630.

=== Career ===
As an architect, his work focused on Roman Catholic religious buildings and hôtel particuliers for the wealthy elite.

He designed the Chapelle des Ursulines, a Roman Catholic chapel on the Rue Mignet listed as a monument historique since 1924. Additionally, he designed the Chapelle Saint Mitre, another Roman Catholic chapel, on the Route d'Eguilles.

His designs include the following:

- Hôtel de Boisgelin, located at 11, rue du Quatre-Septembre and listed since 1964
- Hôtel de Lestang-Parade, located at 18, rue de l'Opéra and listed since 1980
- Hôtel de Forbin, located at 20 Cours Mirabeau and listed since 1990
- Hôtel de Ville, in Aix-en-Provence, listed since 1995
- Pavillon Vendôme, listed since 1953

=== Personal life ===
He married Madeleine Clemens on 15 February 1638. They had two sons:

- Balthazard Pavillon (1648–1729)
- Jean Pavillon (1651–unknown)

He married Madeleine Grivet on 18 December 1653. They had three children:

- Magdeleine Pavillon (1655–unknown)
- Françoise Pavillon (1656–unknown)
- François Pavillon (1670–unknown)

He died on 24 November 1670 in Aix-en-Provence.

=== Legacy ===
The Rue Pavillon in Aix-en-Provence is named in his honour.

== Secondary source ==
- Jean Boyer, Pierre Pavillon (1612-1670): un architecte-sculpteur parisien en Provence (Nobele, 1968).

== Gallery ==
Buildings designed by Pierre Pavillon
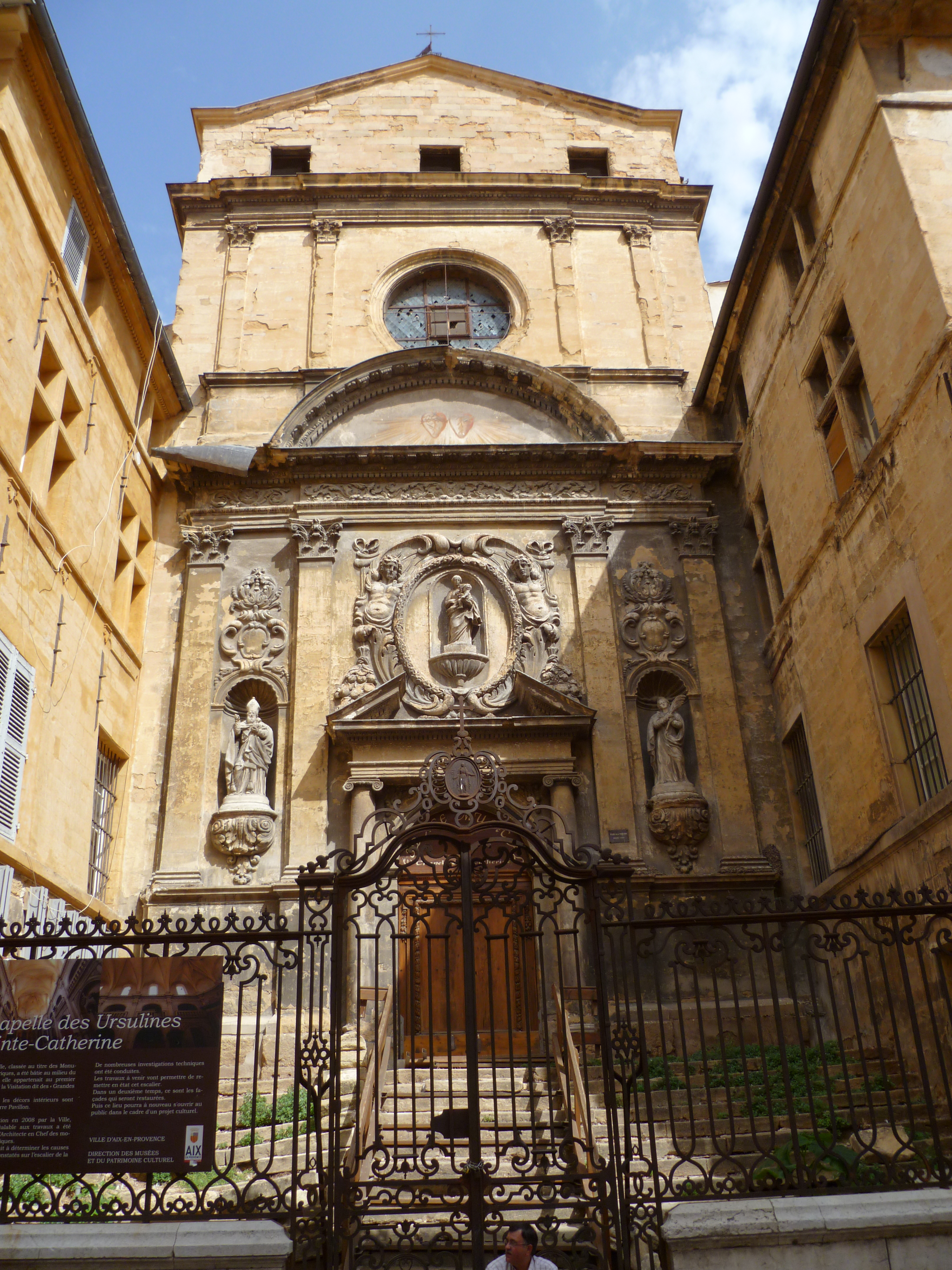
Chapelle des Ursulines in Aix-en-Provence

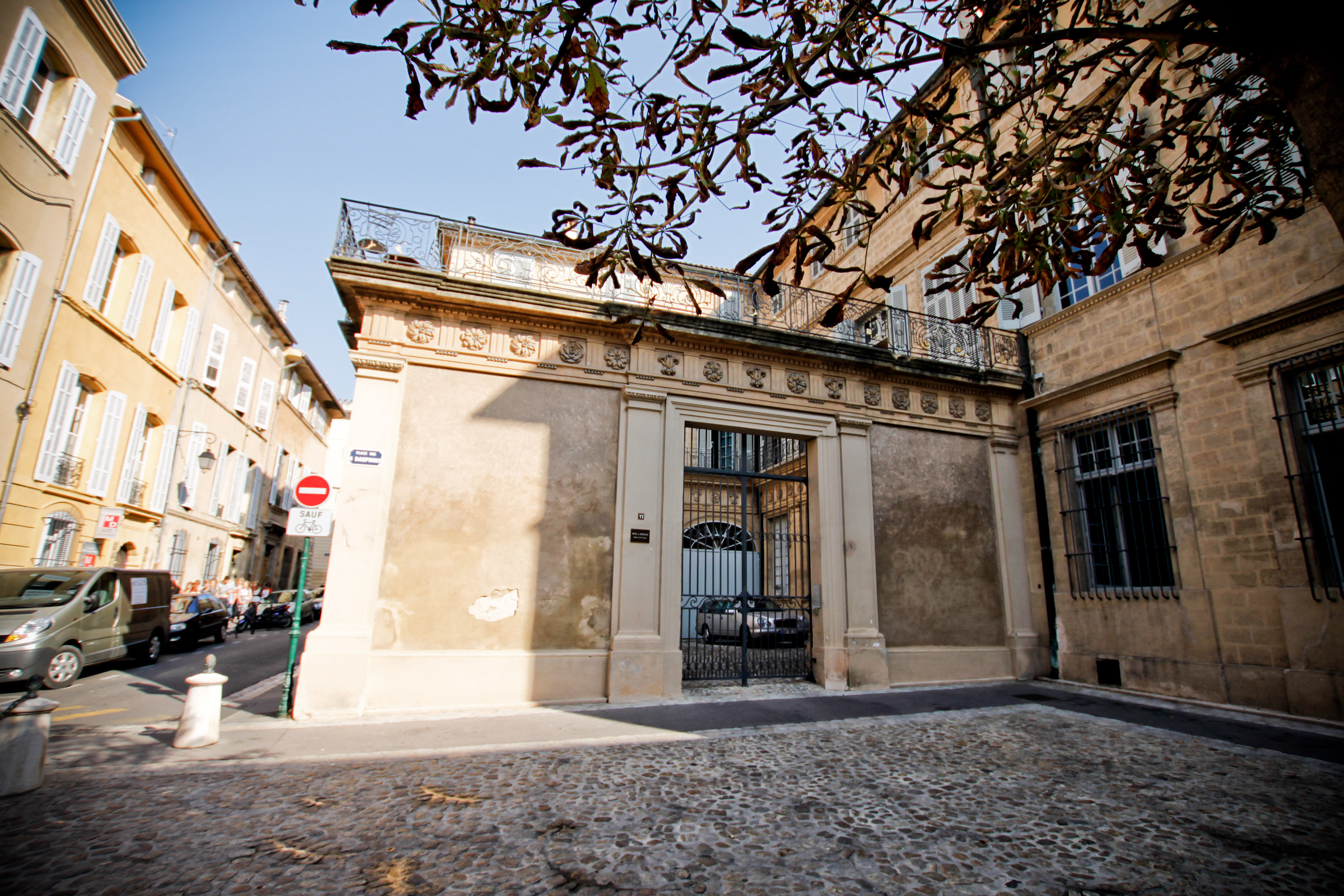
Hôtel de Boisgelin in Aix-en-Provence

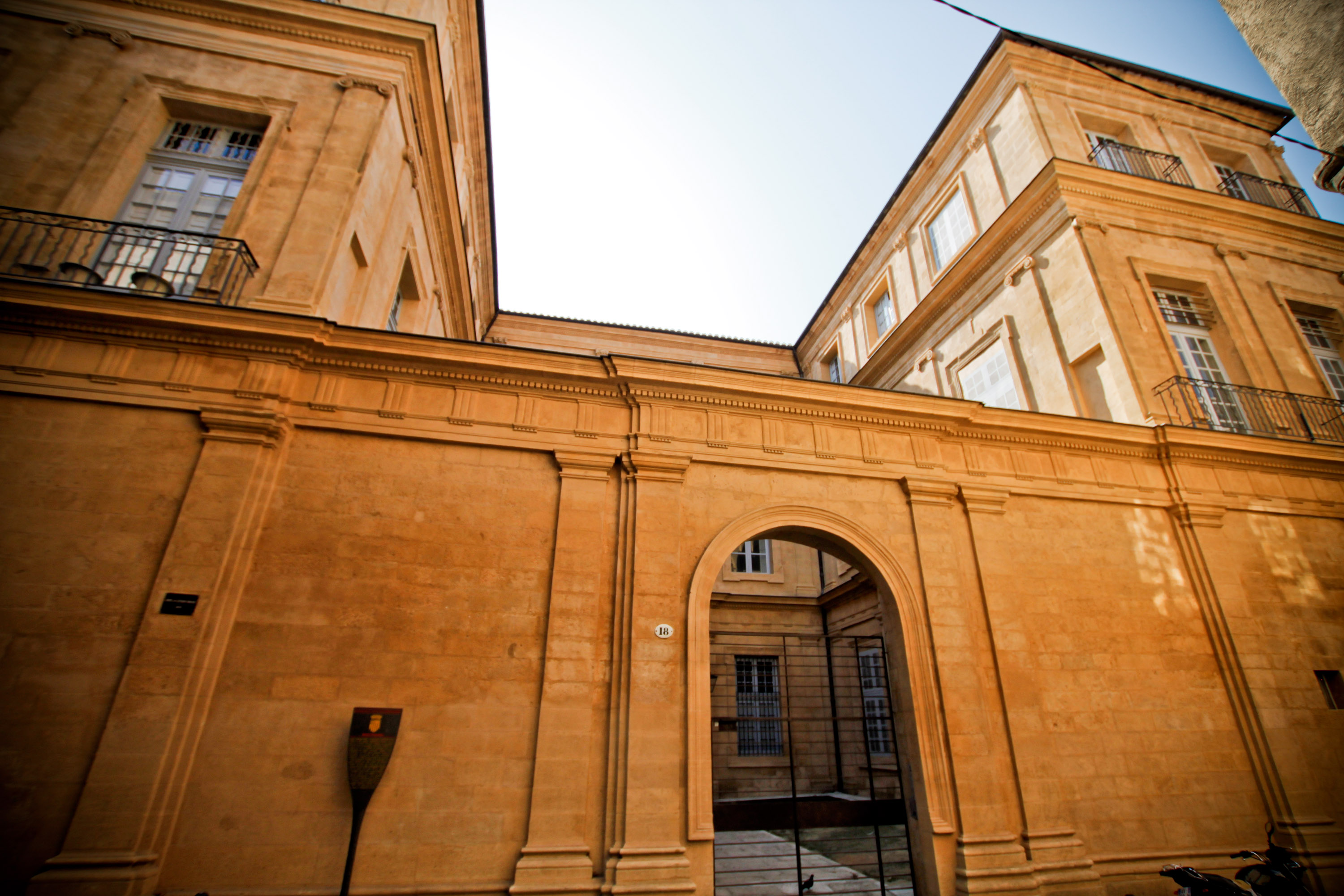
Hôtel de Lestang-Parade in Aix-en-Provence

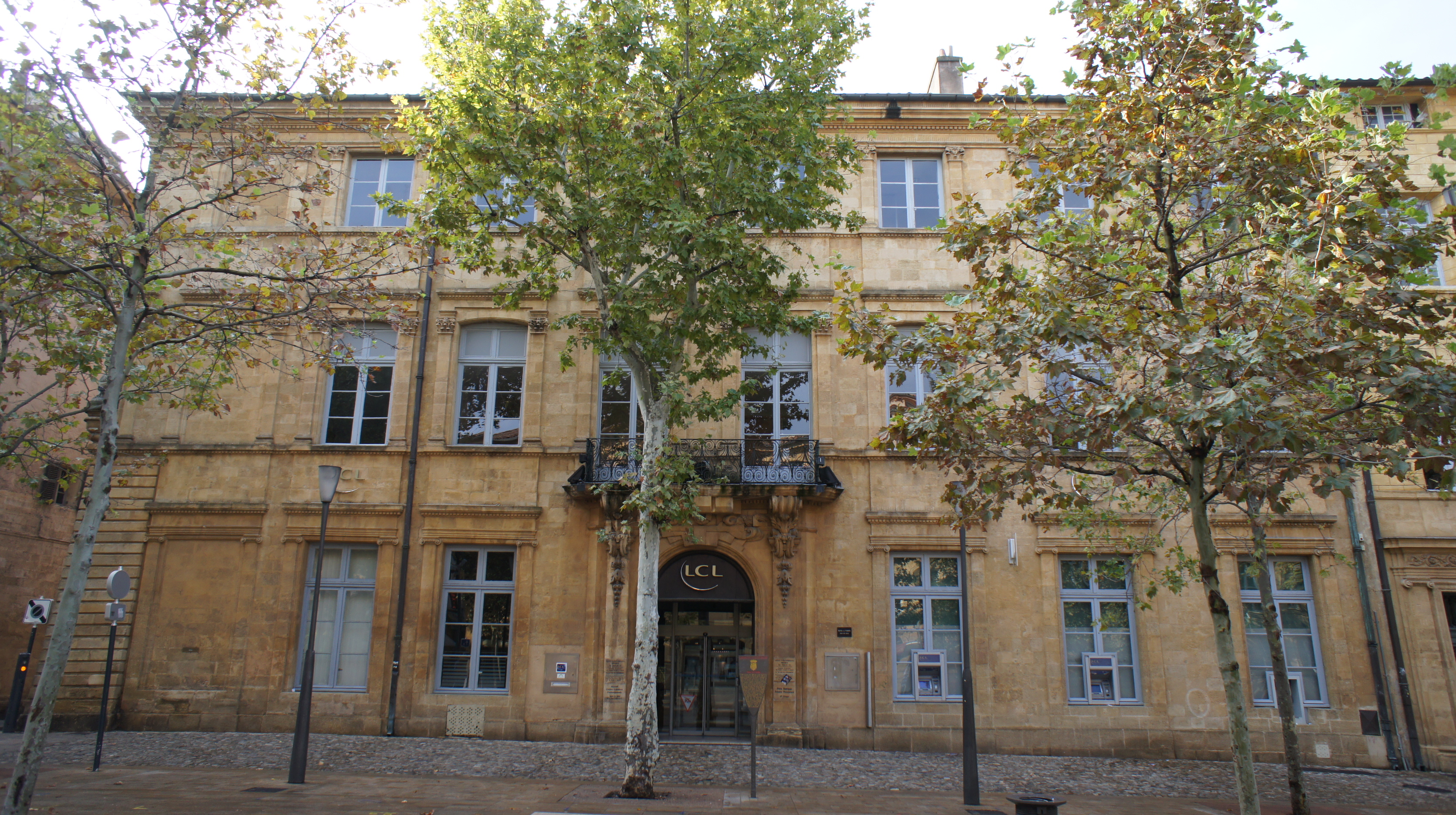
Hôtel de Forbin in Aix-en-Provence

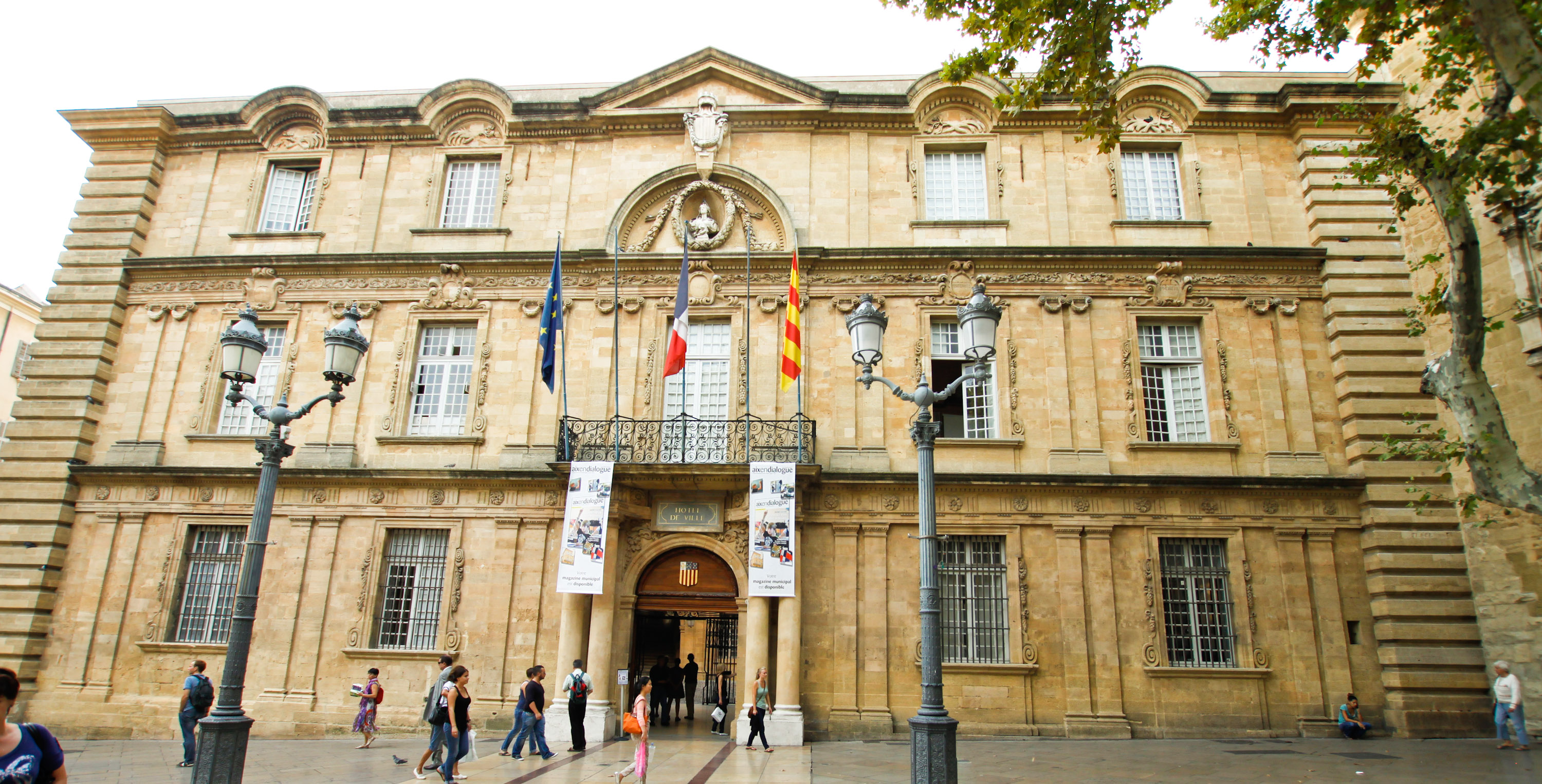
City Hall in Aix-en-Provence

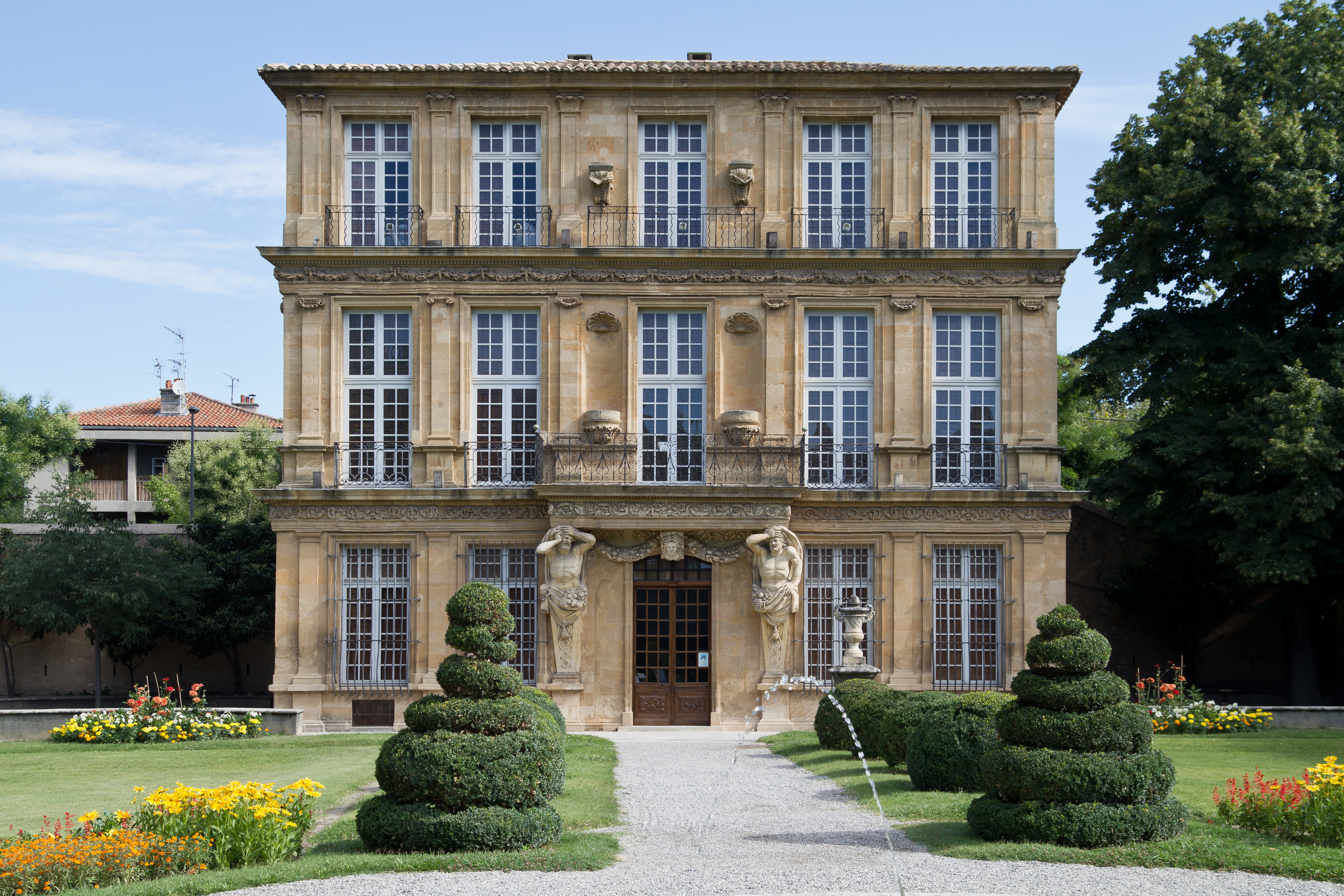
Pavillon Vendôme in Aix-en-Provence

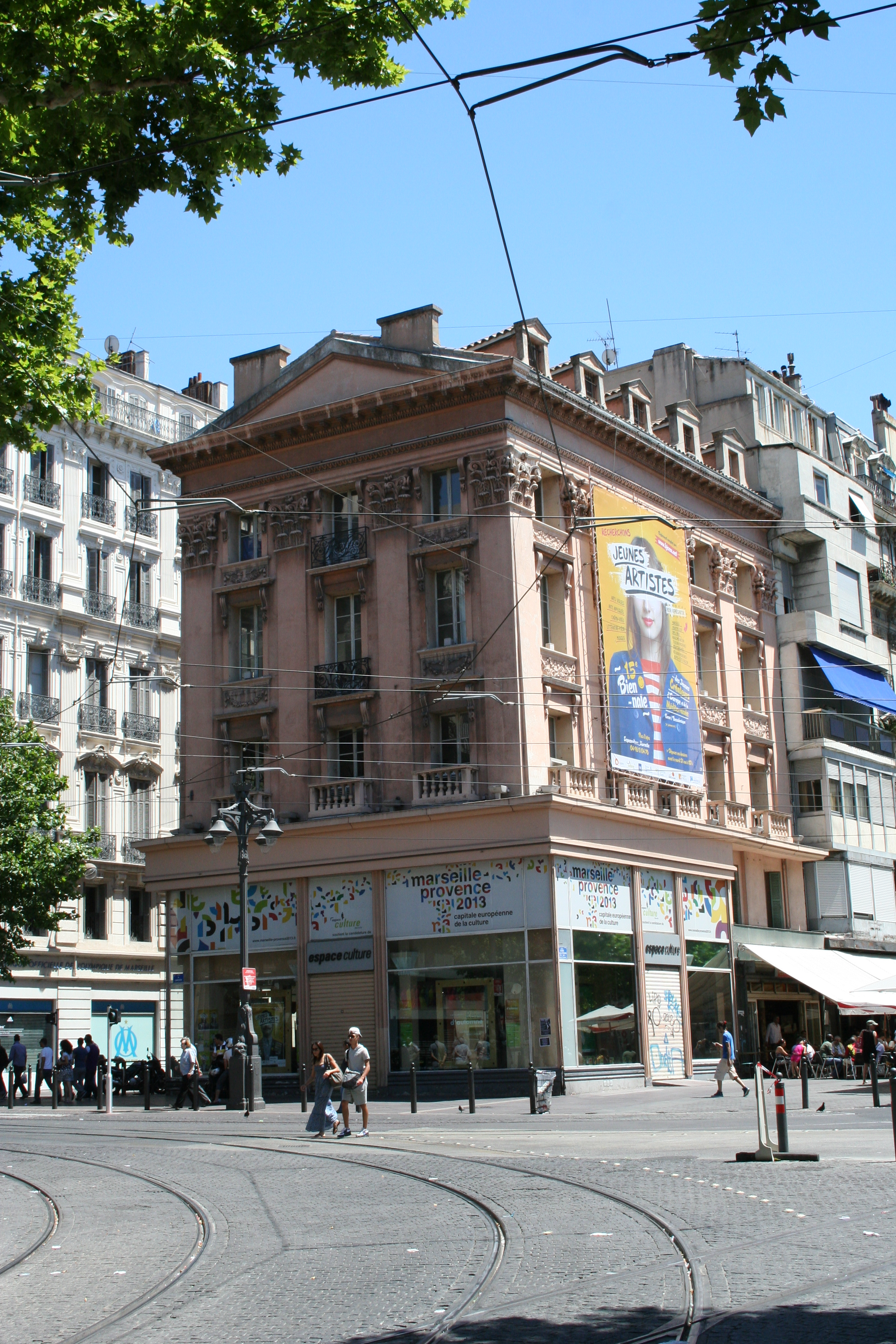
Maison du Figaro in Marseille
