= École Nationale Supérieure des Sciences de l'Information et des Bibliothèques =

College in France

Coordinates: 45.7802°N 4.8629°E

National School of Information Science and Libraries
- École nationale supérieure des sciences de l'information et des bibliothèques
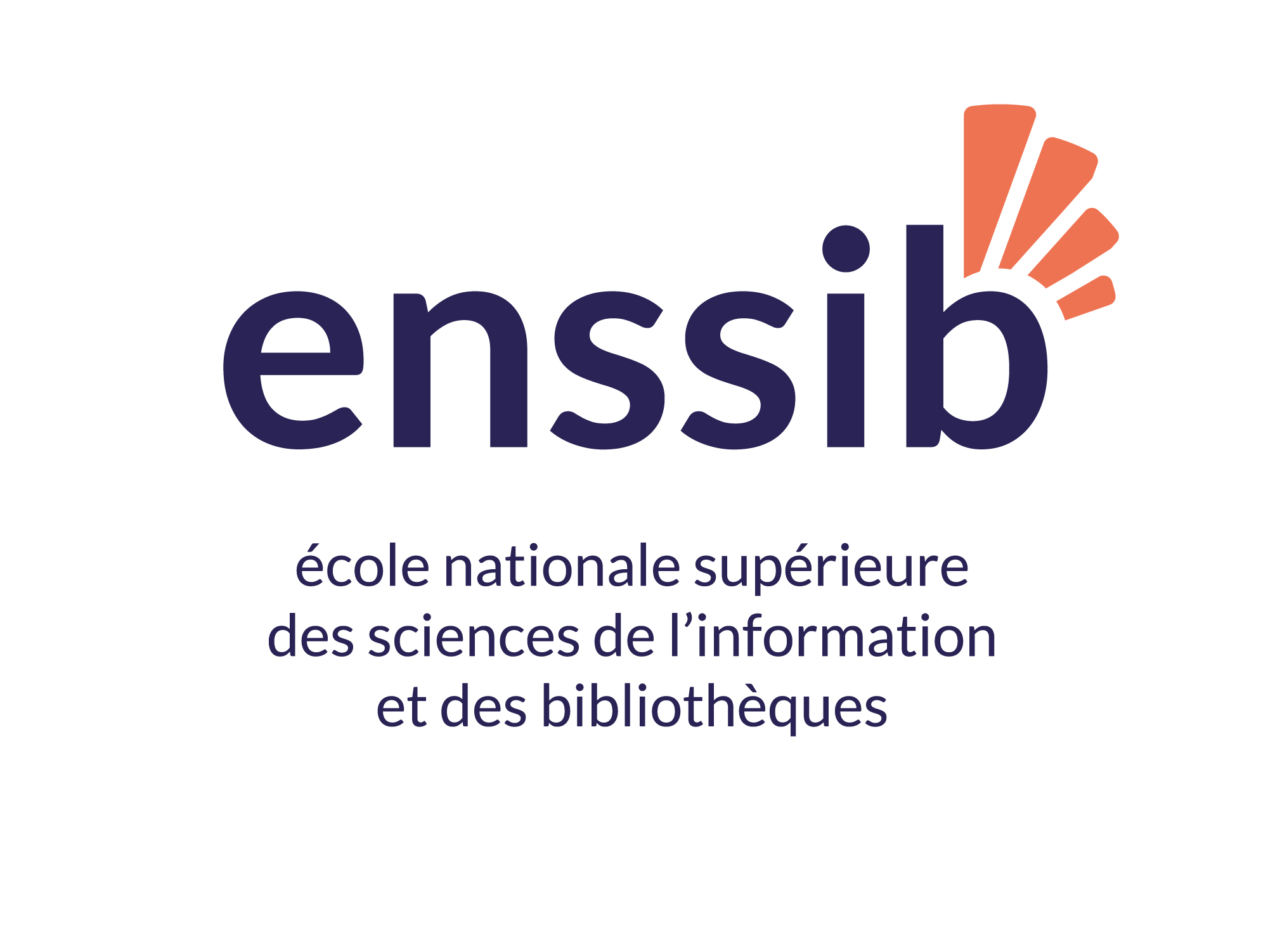
- Other name: Enssib
- Type: Grand établissement
- Established: 1992
- Location: 17/21 boulevard du 11 novembre 1918, Villeurbanne, Auvergne-Rhône-Alpes, France

The École nationale supérieure des sciences de l'information et des bibliothèques (ENSSIB; French for National Superior School of Information Science and Libraries) is a French grande école based in Villeurbanne, near Lyon. It is administered by the Ministry of Higher Education, Research and Innovation.

Enssib's predecessor, the École nationale supérieure de bibliothécaires, was established by decree in 1963 as an Établissement public à caractère administratif. The contemporary Enssib was formed by later decree in 1992, with elevated status as a grand établissement.

It provides education and training for library curators and librarians in the French civil service after a competitive examination. The school is also a member of the University of Lyon and grants a variety of master's degrees, open to those not in the civil service.

Since 2009, the school publishes the Bulletin des bibliothèques de France (ISSN 1292-8399), a journal established in 1956 by the merging of the Bulletin de documentation bibliographique and Bulletin d'information de la Direction des Bibliothèques de France. The school belongs to the Couperin consortium.

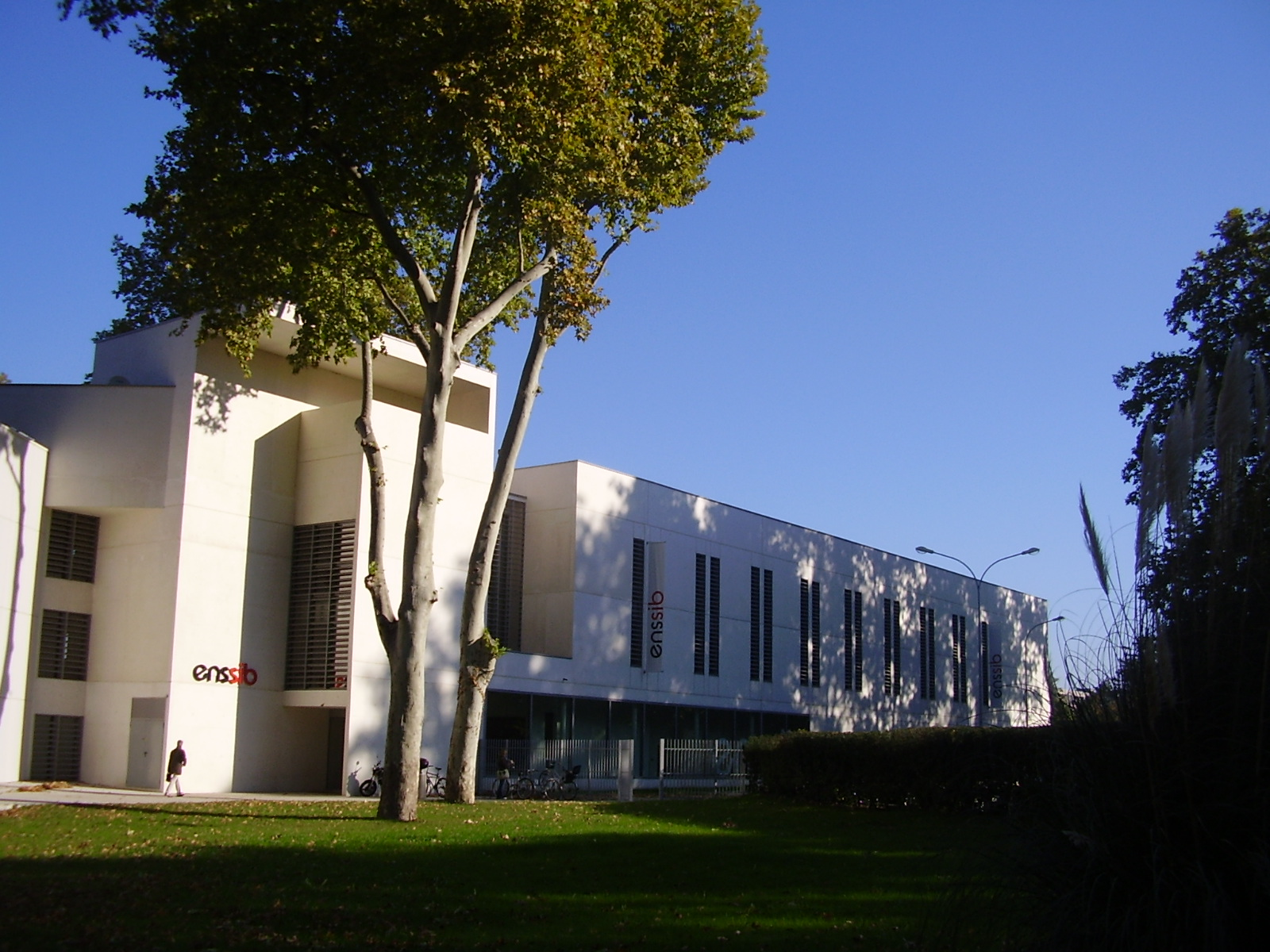
Enssib building, 2007

== See also ==
- Dominique Varry
- List of libraries in France
