= Henri Dobler =

Swiss art collector, painter, poet and art critic

- Born: 1863
- Died: 1941 (aged 77–78)
- Occupations: Art collector Painter; Poet; Art critic

Henri Dobler (1863–1941) was a Swiss art collector, painter, poet and art critic. He is best known for refurbishing the Pavillon Vendôme in Aix-en-Provence, France, from 1906 to 1914.

== Biography ==
=== Early life ===
Henri Dobler was born in 1863 in Switzerland. His parents sold silk and textiles in Marseille.

=== Adult life ===
He started his career in the French Army. In 1895, he gave up on his military ambitions and focused on art. He started collecting art, wrote a poetry book, and started painting. His paintings dealt with mythology and romanticism. However, it is thought that his paintings were not very successful because of a personal and vocal rift he had with Paul Cézanne, whose work he called "dirty paintings" and "the biggest scam of the century".

In 1906, he purchased the Pavillon Vendôme in Aix-en-Provence and refurbished it until 1914. He also took pains to add furniture specifically from Provence to the house. Meanwhile, he also wrote books about the history of architecture in Aix-en-Provence and Marseille.

Hubert de Courcy painted his portrait.

=== Death ===
He died in 1941.

== Bibliography ==
- La Petite Sirène (1899)
- La maison de rêve (1900)
- Les Vestiges des architectures et des arts décoratifs provençaux aux XVIIe et XVIIIe siècles à Aix-en-Provence (1910)
- Les Vestiges des architectures et des arts décoratifs provençaux aux XVIIe et XVIIIe siècles à Marseille (1913)
- Six mois de journalisme indépendant en province (1922)
- Le cadre de la vie mondaine à Aix-en-Provence aux XVIIe et XVIIIe siècles: Boudoirs et jardins (1928)
