= Dominique Varry =

French historian

Dominique Varry (born 22 July 1956, in Belfort) is a French historian of books and professor at École nationale supérieure des sciences de l'information et des bibliothèques, part of the University of Lyon.

== Biography ==
Dominique Varry began his career as an auditor in the 4th section of the École pratique des hautes études and at the École Nationale des Chartes, as well as a professor of history. He quickly left secondary teaching to become a researcher with the Department of Books and Reading at the Ministry of Culture (France). His research thesis on the history of private libraries at the end of the "Old Regime" was supervised by Henri-Jean Martin, a renowned expert on the history of the book.

He was appointed a lecturer in Information Science and Communication at the Jean Moulin University Lyon 3 in 1989, as well as at École nationale supérieure des sciences de l'information et des bibliothèques (ENSSIB). In 2005, he was appointed professor of the book at the latter school.

Whilst serving a number of terms as director of research at ENSSIB (the last ending on 17 December 2010), he continued to edit a number of international journals in his field, including the Revue française d'histoire du livre, the Histoire et civilisation du livre : revue internationale (initiated in 2005), Tipofilologia : rivista internazionale di studi filologici e linguistici sui testi a stampa and Mémoires du livre (an international electronic review). He is also the director of the collection at the "Institute of History of the Book of Lyon (Metamorphoses Book)."

== Works ==
- Une seigneurie du Pays Belfortain, la « Paroisse de Phaffans » au XVIIIe siècle, Bulletin de la Société belfortaine d'émulation, n° 76, 1984, paru en 1985
- Guide des sources de l'histoire de la Révolution française dans les bibliothèques, Paris, ministère de la Culture, Direction du livre et de la lecture, 1988
- Histoire des bibliothèques françaises, tome III, Les bibliothèques de la Révolution et du XIXe siècle 1789-1914, Paris, Promodis-Cercle de la librairie, 1991. Seconde édition 2009 (dir.)
- Hommes de Dieu et Révolution en Alsace, Turnhout, Brépols, 1993 (en coll.)
- L'Europe et le livre. Réseaux et pratiques du négoce de librairie XVIe-XIXe siècles, Paris, Klincksieck, 1996 (codir.)
- Le Livre et l'historien. Études offertes au professeur Henri-Jean Martin, Genève, Droz, 1997 (codir.)
- « Sous la main de la Nation ». Les bibliothèques de l'Eure confisquées sous la Révolution française, Ferney-Voltaire, Centre international d'étude du XVIIIe siècle, 2005
- Responsabilité scientifique du dossier Lyon et les livres, dans Histoire et civilisation du livre : revue internationale, 2, 2006
- Co responsabilité éditoriale du numéro À travers l'histoire du livre et des Lumières. Études d'histoire du livre offertes au professeur Daniel Roche par ses élèves, ses collègues et ses amis, dans Histoire et civilisation du livre : revue internationale, 7, 2011
- 50 ans d'histoire du livre : 1958-2008, Villeurbanne, Presses de l'enssib, 2014 (dir.)
- Du parchemin à l'ère électronique. Une histoire du livre et de la lecture. Liège, Céfal, 2014 (avec Jean-François Gilmont)
- L’imprimé scientifique. Enjeux matériels et intellectuels, Lausanne, Éditions BHMS, 2014 (en collaboration avec Miriam Nicoli)
