= Jean-Baptiste Marie de Piquet, Marquess of Méjanes =

French aristocrat and book collector

Jean-Baptiste Marie de Piquet
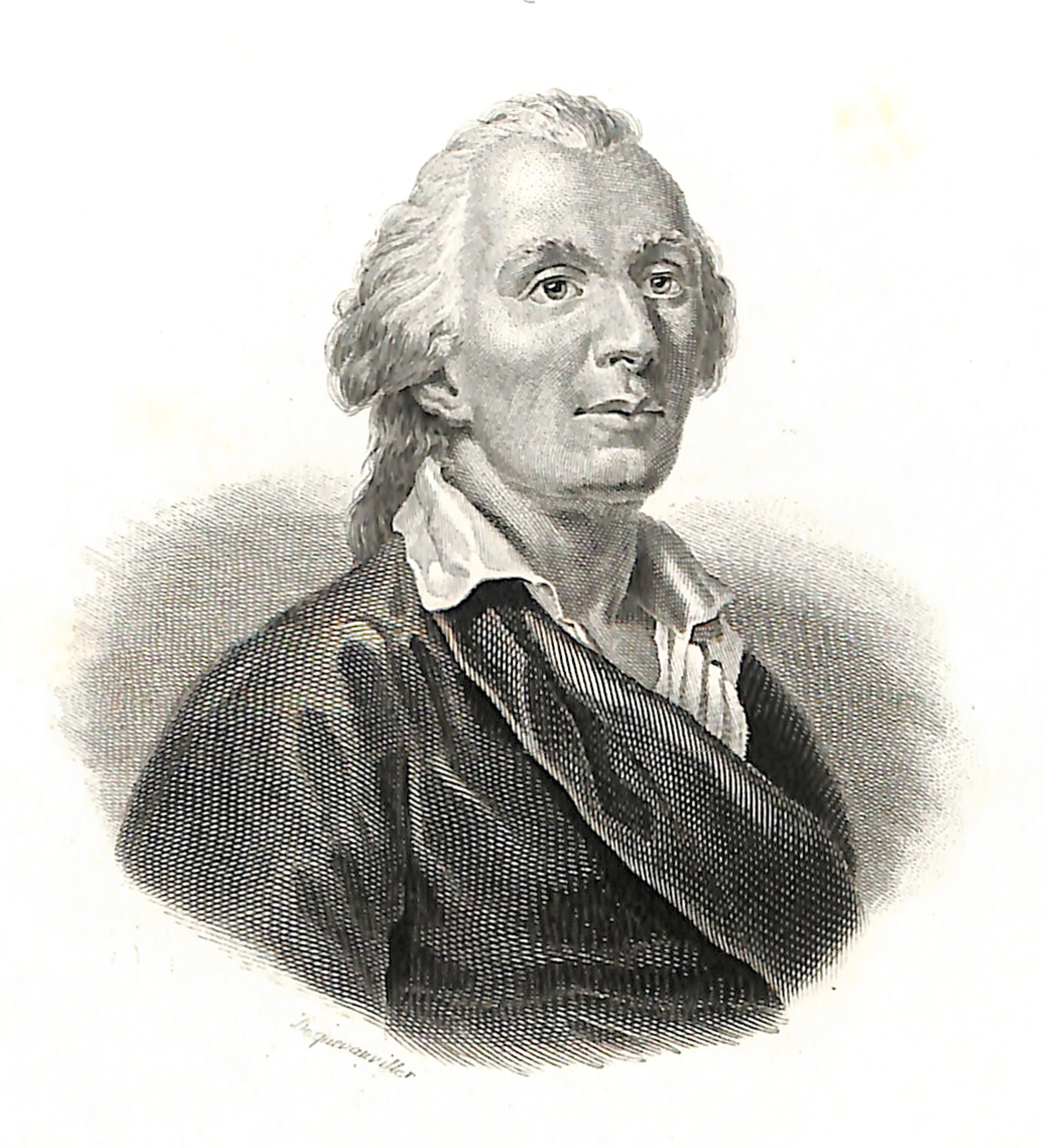
- Born: August 5, 1729; Arles, France
- Died: October 5, 1786 (aged 57); Paris, France
- Education: Collège Louis-le-Grand
- Title: Marquess of Méjanes; Lord of Albaron; Lord of Saint Vincent
- Spouse: Marie Gabrielle de Massilian (married 1759)
- Children: Joseph Marie Marc Antoine de Piquet (died in infancy)
- Parent: Guillaume de Piquet

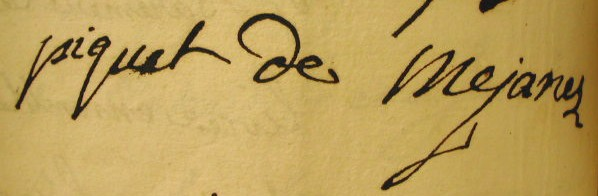
Signature by the Marquis of Méjanes in 1750

Jean-Baptiste Marie de Piquet, Marquess of Méjanes (1729-1786) was a French aristocrat, public servant and book collector.

== Early life ==
Jean-Baptiste Marie de Piquet was born on 5 August 1729 in Arles, France, during the time of the Great Plague of Marseille. The heroism of his father, Guillaume de Piquet (1689-1747), the Marquess of Méjanes, resulted in the land of Méjanes being raised to marquisate status in 1723. Piquet inherited this land in 1748 following his father's death.

Piquet was educated at the Collège Louis-le-Grand, where his love of reading and books was noticed early on.

== Career ==
Piquet was the Marquess of Méjanes, the Lord of Albaron, and the Lord of Saint Vincent. He served as the First Consul of Arles from 1761 to 1774 and the Royal Secretary of Arles in 1766 and 1784. He also served as the First Consul of Aix-en-Provence and State Prosecutor of Provence from 1777 to 1778.

He worked diligently to improve the lot of his fellow citizens.

== Personal life ==
Piquet was a bibliophile and a book collector. He had the reputation of being an intelligent, honest, simple, and modest man. A large part of his income went toward books.

In 1759, he married Marie Gabrielle Massilian, imposing on her a relatively austere and economical life despite his fortune. On his deathbed, he regretted this lifestyle and wrote his final words to his wife on 30 September 1786: "[I] ask again forgiveness, if I did not contribute to your happiness, as much as I would have liked during the time that we were united together."

== Death and legacy ==
He moved to Paris in 1783, where he died on 5 October 1786 without a descendant, his son Joseph Marie Marc Antoine de Piquet having died on 4 August 1760 at the age of 6 months and a half. His sole heir was his nephew, the Marquis de Lagoy.

In his will, he bequeathed all his books, between 60,000 and 80,000 volumes, to Provence, under the stipulation that they be made accessible to ordinary citizens. He also added a yearly legacy of 5,000 books in annuities for Provence, to continue increasing the number of the collection. This bequest led to the creation of the public library of Aix-en-Provence known as the Bibliothèque Méjanes. His bust, designed by Jean-Antoine Houdon, is displayed in the library.

== Bibliography ==
- Jean-Marc Châtelain, Un cabinet d'amateur à la fin du xviii^{e} siècle : le marquis de Méjanes bibliophile, Aix-en-Provence, Cité du livre, Paris, Association internationale de bibliophilie, 2006. (ISBN 2-910166-48-1) br
- E. Rouard, Notice sur la bibliothèque d'Aix, dite de Méjanes [archive], 1831, pages 122-139.
- Paul Masson (sous la direction de), Encyclopédie départementale des Bouches-du-Rhône, tome 4, volume 2, Marseille, Archives départementales des Bouches-du-Rhône, 17 volumes parus de 1913 à 1937, p. 339-331.
- Archives municipales d'Arles, et aux Archives départementales des Bouches-du-Rhône
- Généalogie de la Maison de Piquet, par le Baron Du Roure, 1907, pages 17–19
- Nobiliaire d'Arles, par l'abbé Bonnemant
