= Sara Peninsula =

Caspian Sea's islands

Sara is an uninhabited peninsula and former island situated in the southeastern part of the Caspian Sea within Azerbaijan. The peninsula has increased in size due to the decrease in sea levels of the Caspian Sea.
