= Pavillon Vendôme =

Historic pavilion in Aix-en-Provence, France

Coordinates: 43.5311°N 5.4421°E

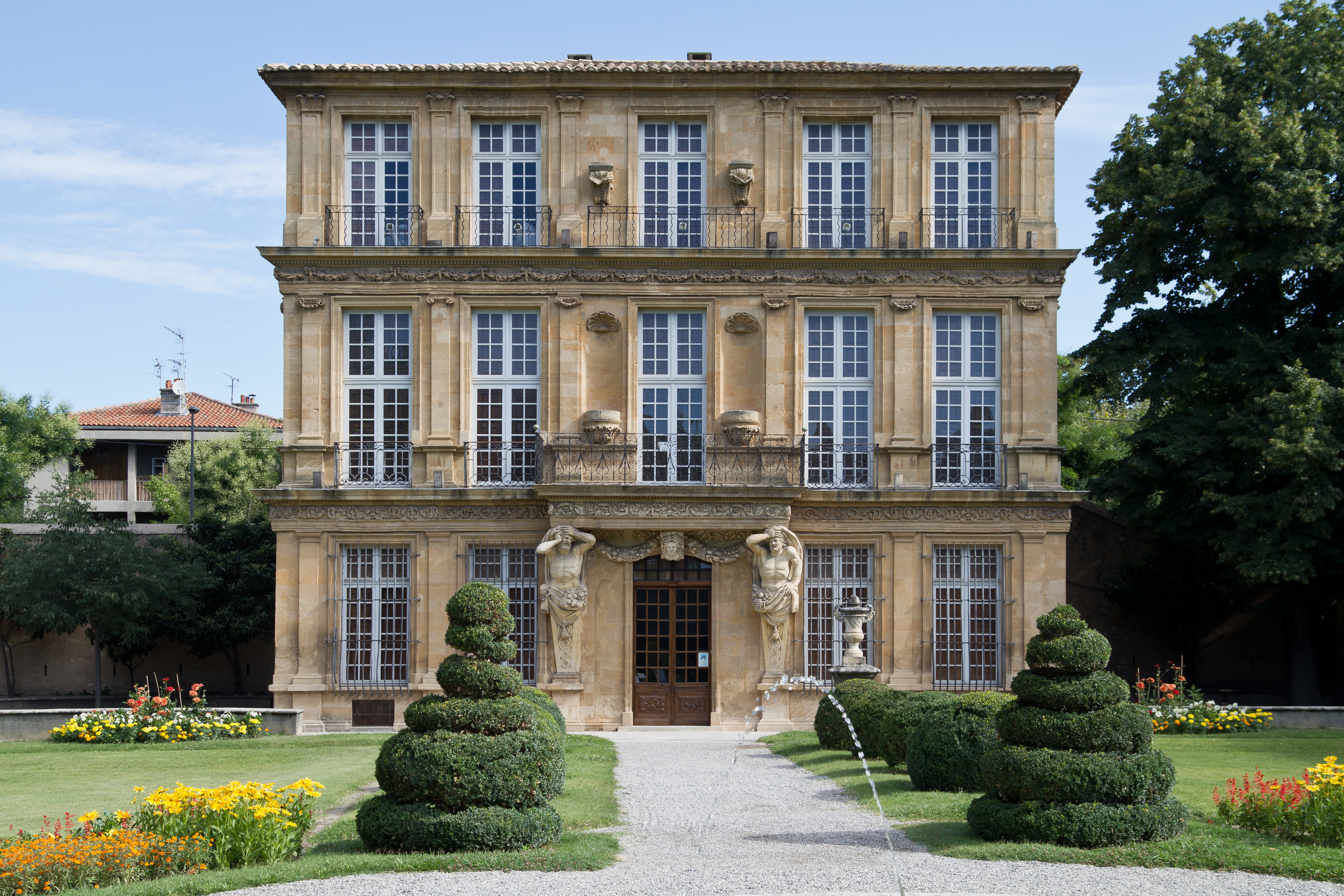
Pavillon Vendôme

The Pavillon Vendôme is a historic pavilion surrounded by a French formal garden located 32 rue Celony in Aix-en-Provence, France.

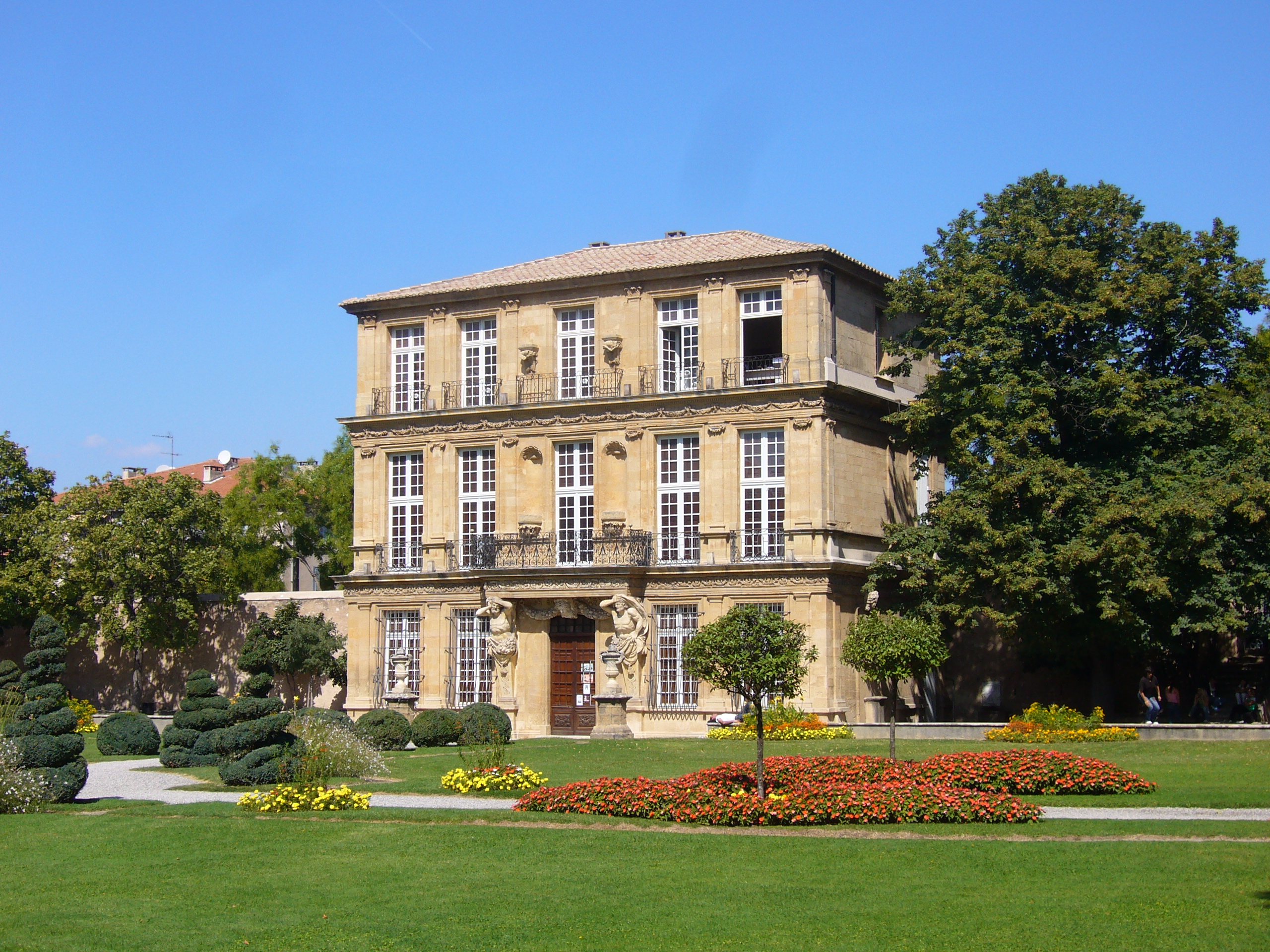
Pavillon Vendôme

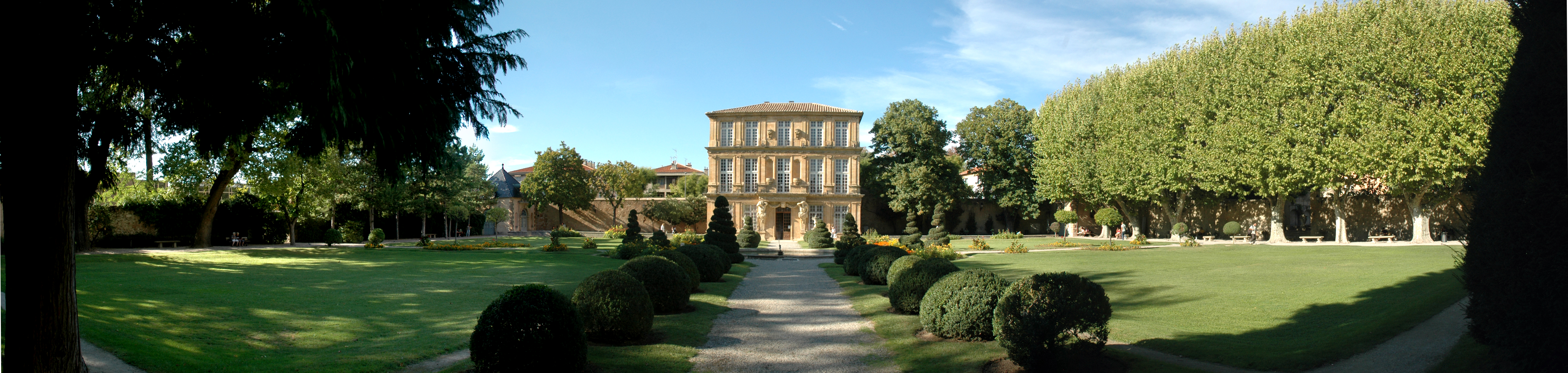
Pavillon Vendôme

== History ==
It was built by architect Pierre Pavillon (1612-1670) between 1665 and 1667.

It was commissioned by for Louis, Duke of Vendôme (1612-1669) as a place where he could take his lover, Lucrèce de Forbin Solliès, also known as "la Belle du Canet". He died in the house on 6 August 1669.

Later, it was owned by the painter Jean-Baptiste van Loo (1684-1745), who had a studio there. It was subsequently purchased by Barthélemy-Louis Reboul, Secretary of the Académie des Sciences, Agriculture, Arts et Belles Lettres d'Aix.

After the French Revolution of 1789, it was purchased by Jean-Joseph-Pierre Guigou, who was Bishop of Angoulême, who turned it into a Catholic boarding school for girls.

In 1906, it was purchased by Henri Dobler (1863-1941), a Swiss art collector, painter and poet. He donated it to the city of Aix-en-Provence after his death. It has served as a museum since then. It is home to temporary art exhibitions.

== Heritage significance ==
The house has been listed as a Monument historique since 27 March 1914; the garden since 15 October 1953.
