= Hôtel de Gallifet =

Hôtel Particulier in Aix-en-Provence in France

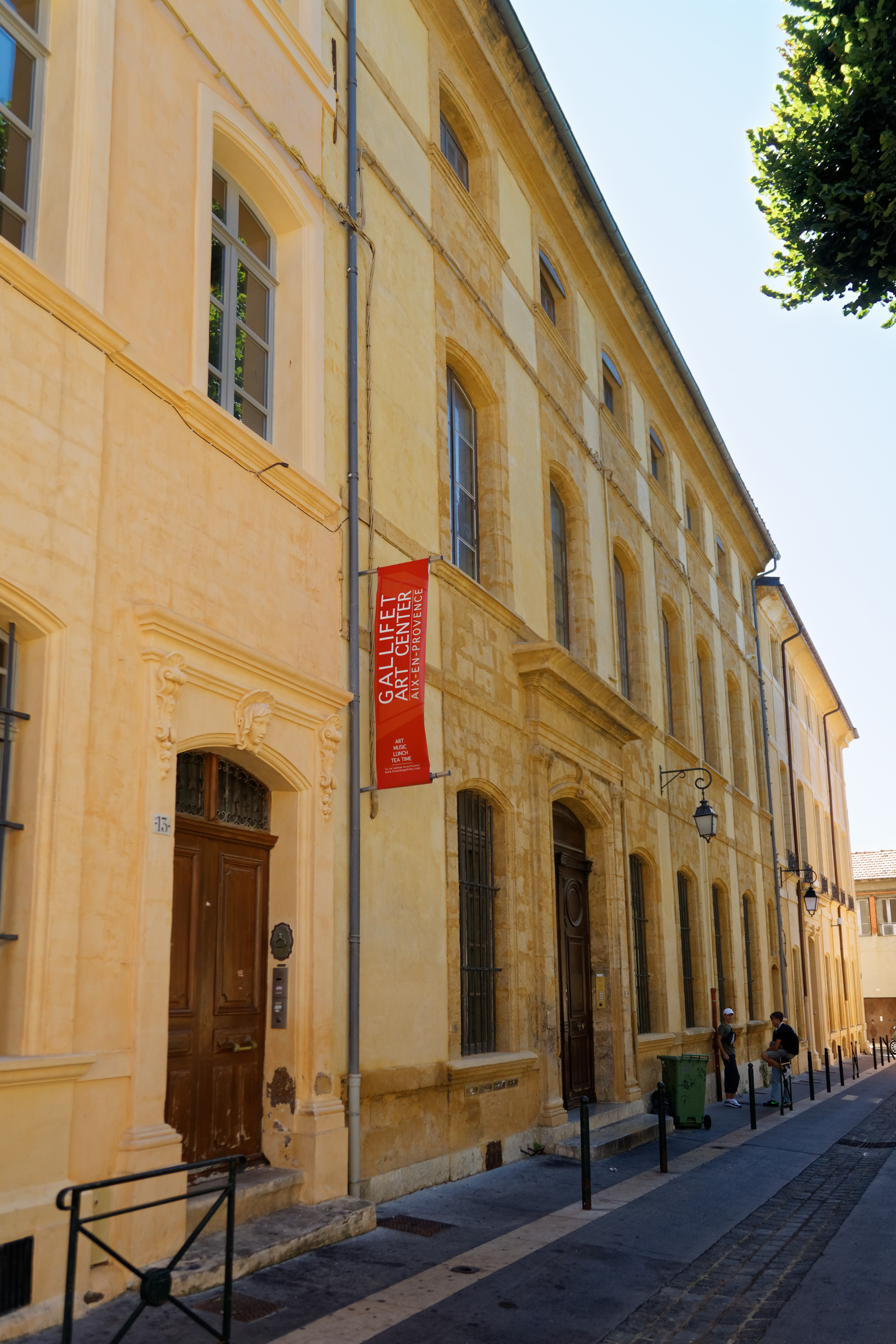
Hôtel de Gallifet

Hôtel de Gallifet is an 18th-century Hôtel Particulier located in the Quartier Mazarin of Aix-en-Provence in France. Today, it serves as a contemporary art center for the public. It is located at 52 rue Cardinale in the Mazarin district of Aix-en-Provence.

== History ==
Hôtel de Gallifet was built in the early 18th century by Jean-Leon Leotard, the Lord of Entrages. Léotard bestowed the building onto the House of Gallifet, a noble family originating from the Dauphin region of the South of France, as part of a marriage agreement for his daughter Madeleine de Léotard d’Entrages to Simon Alexandre Jean de Galliffet, seigneur du Tholonet from 1716-1793. He was head of the eldest branch of the Gallifet family in the 16th century, the king's advisor and Treasurer of the cardinals of Bourbon.

The couple had one child in 1748, named Louis François Alexandre, Prince de Martigues de Galliffet, Comte de Galliffet. The building was later owned by General and Marquis Gaston-Alexandre-August, Prince of Martigues, a French military man born in Paris in 1830. He was Minister of War under the government of Waldeck-Rousseau.

In the mid nineteenth century, the Hôtel de Gallifet was the residence of the Jewish Crémieux family. During the Second World War, the building was occupied by German officers. The members of the Crémieux family who lived in Hôtel de Gallifet at the time were obliged to flee, but were saved from deportation along with the other Jewish families of Aix-en-Provence, because they were specially protected Jews of the Pope.

== Art and Culture ==
Later the Hôtel de Gallifet came under the ownership of Nicolas Mazet, and in 2010 he opened it as a workspace for contemporary artists of Aix-en-Provence. The ground floor of Hôtel de Gallifet became an art center for cultural and artistic exchange. It is one of the largest of several Hotel Particuliers of the Quartier Mazarin which have been opened to the public as art centers and museums, each focusing on a specific aspect of art and culture.

Throughout the year Hôtel de Gallifet hosts exhibitions by both established and emerging contemporary artists. Works by Carl André, Francois Arnal, Diadji Diop, Jannis Kounellis, Mario Merz, and Huang Yong Ping were displayed over the during five years in personal shows, group shows, as well as shows built around private collections. Since 2013, conferences, concerts, and workshops have also been regularly organized.

In the courtyard, an installation entitled "Nager dans le Bonheur]," by Senegalese artist Diadji Diop] features a sculpture of a red man giving the illusion of swimming through the gravel of the courtyard. The courtyard additionally has original graffiti by artist Miss.Tic

=== Artists, exhibitions, and events ===
In 2010, Hôtel de Gallifet proposed to host Francois Arnal's last retrospective, Happy Days. During the summer of that same year, Hôtel de Gallifet hosted a street art show entitled L’école de la rue.

In 2011, the exhibition entitled Dolce Vita by Marcello Geppetti revealed work by one of history's first paparazzi. Commissioners Clément Chéroux and Sam Stourdze selected twenty pictures for the Centre Pompidou Metz show Paparazzi, followed by a show at Frankfurt's Schirn Kunsthalle.

The following year in 2012, a summer show entitled Fragile displayed works from artists Charlotte Cochelin, Claudia Squitieri, Dan Miller, Emilie Schalck, Julien Salaud, Laura Todoran, Little K, Mai Hofstad, Maxime Chanson, Michael Dandrieux, Samon Takahashi, Thomas Geffrier, and Tiphaine de Bodman.

In 2013, the Marseille-Provence region was selected as the European Capital of Culture. Hôtel de Gallifet helped promote the year's theme of maintaining multicultural integration by hosting a number of pieces and shows for the public, including Abbottabad by Huang Yong Ping, a courtyard installation of a replica of Abbottabad overgrown with plants. Furthermore, Hôtel de Gallifet hosted French Kiss, a show with a theme of multiculturalism and harmonious, integrated living. The show featured 13 artists, including Arik Einstein, Uri Zohar, and Pietro Ruffo.

That year, a classical music event organized by L’Acadèmie des Nuits Pianistique featured Carlos Roqué Alsina and Frederic Aguessy.

In 2014, the Hôtel de Gallifet presented seven works from artists Carl Andre, Jannis Kounellis, Mario Merz, and Bruce Nauman, selected from the personal collection of Francis Solet, and entitled L’Énergie de Materieux, Arte Povera and Minimal Art. In 2015, the hotel hosted exhibitions and installations by abstract artist Arnaud Lapierre and German painter and printmaker Martin Werthmann.

In 2016 the Urban Legends Festival was held in the hotel. In 2017 the hotel hosted a Christmas market. In 2017 the gallery hosted a travelling exhibition for the HSBC Prize for Photography.
