= Gaspard de Gueidan =

French aristocrat and lawyer

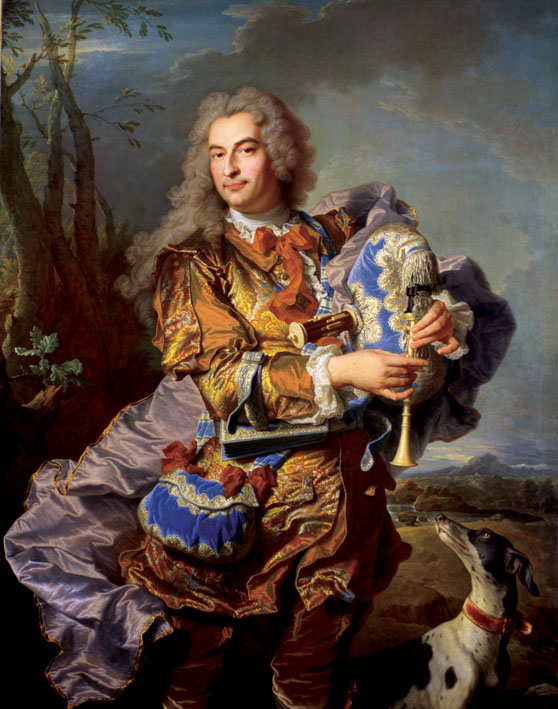
- 1738 portrait by Hyacinthe Rigaud
- Born: 10 April 1688; Aix-en-Provence
- Died: 23 February 1767 (aged 78); Aix-en-Provence
- Occupation: Public official
- Spouse: Angélique de Simiane
- Children: Joseph Gaspard de Gueidan; Anne Adélaïde de Gueidan; Catherine de Gueidan; Pierre Claude Secret de Gueidan; Étienne Alexandre de Gueidan; Timoléon de Gueidan
- Parent(s): Pierre de Gueidan; Madeleine de Trets

Gaspard de Gueidan (de Valabre) (1688–1767) was a French aristocrat and lawyer. He served as the Président à mortier of the Parlement of Aix-en-Provence.

== Biography ==
=== Early life ===
Gaspard de Gueidan was born on 10 April 1688 in Aix-en-Provence. He grew up at the Hôtel de Gueydan, located at 22 on the Cours Mirabeau. He was baptised as a Roman Catholic in the Église de la Madeleine in Aix.

His family were bourgeois from Reillanne. His grandfather Gaspard Gueidan (1616-1697), married to Catherine Brémond, purchased a position at the Court of Finances, thus becoming a member of the French aristocracy. His father was Pierre de Gueidan, a wealthy lawyer, and his mother, Madeleine de Trets.

=== Career ===
He entered the Parlement of Aix-en-Provence, where he served as Advocate General, protecting the concerns of the elite. By the 1730s, his speeches were printed. In 1740, he became Président à mortier of the Parliament of Aix.

He was a member of the Académie de Marseille and dreamt of being elected to the Académie française.

His portrait was painted by Hyacinthe Rigaud (1659–1743) in 1738. The painting is based on the character of "Celadon" in L'Astrée by Honoré d'Urfé (1568-1635). It is now displayed in the Musée Granet in Aix.

=== Personal life ===
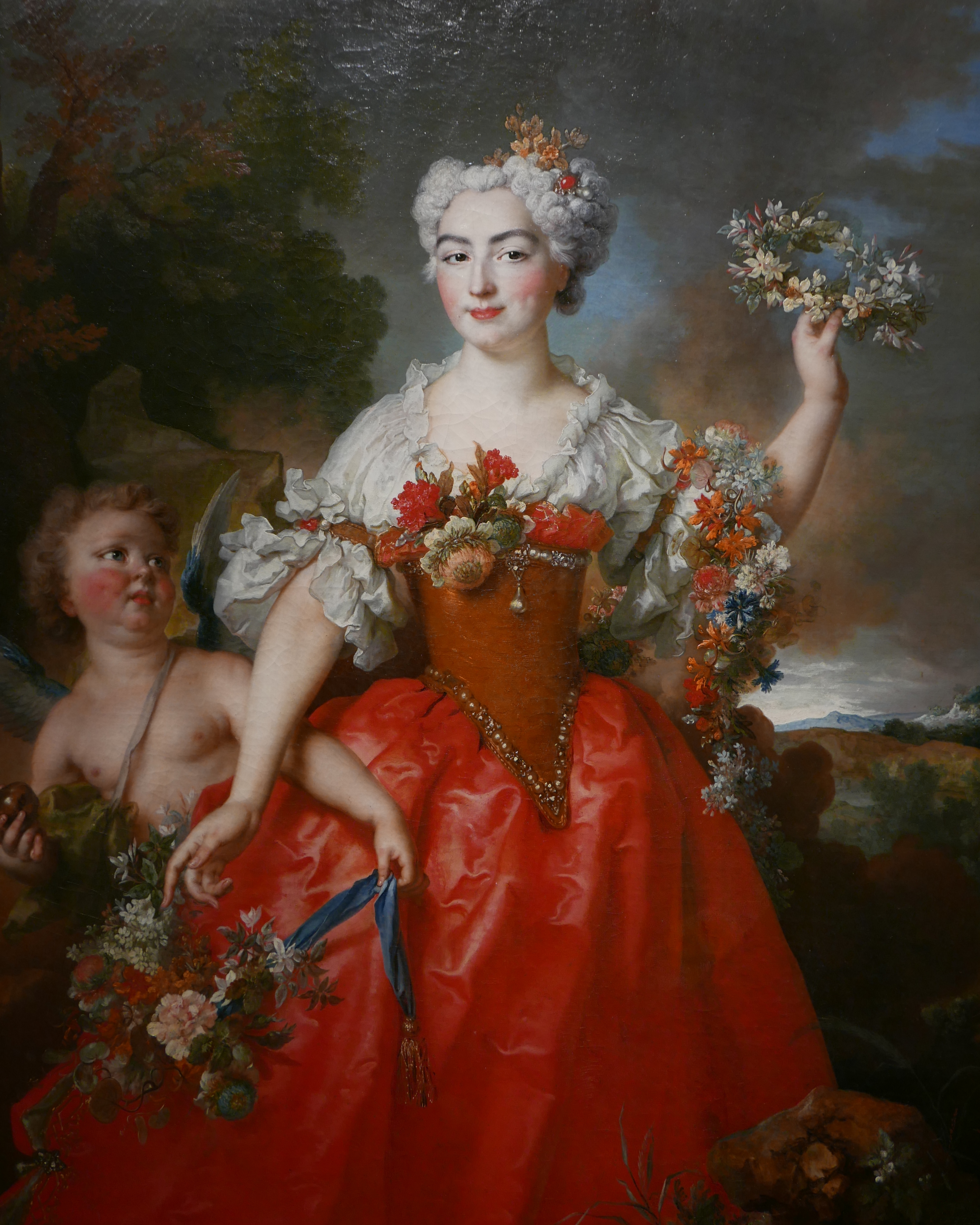
Angélique de Simiane in Flora -1730- by Nicolas de Largillière.

He married Angélique de Simiane, daughter of Joseph marquis de Simiane and Marguerite de Valbelle, on 24 March 1724. They had six children:

- Joseph Gaspard de Gueidan (1725-1784). His second wife was Henriette de Félix d'Ollières. They had a son:
  - Alphonse de Gueidan (1783-1853). He married Joséphine Sibillot.

After Joseph's death, Henriette married Jules Lemercier de Maisoncelle de Richemond (1803-1882). After his death, she donated the Château de Valabre to the city of Gardanne.

- Anne Adélaïde de Gueidan (1725-1786). She married Pierre Louis de Demandolx La Palud on 24 January 1745. She was also the mistress of Giacomo Casanova (1725-1798) by some accounts.
- Catherine de Gueidan (1728-1759). She married Claude de Prats on 4 August 1749.
- Pierre Claude Secret de Gueidan (1733-unknown). He became a Knight of Malta.
- Étienne Alexandre de Gueidan (1735-unknown). He also became a Knight of Malta.
- Timoléon de Gueidan (1744-unknown). He also became a Knight of Malta.

He died on 23 February 1767 in Aix-en-Provence.

== Bibliography ==
- Gaspard de Gueidan, Discours prononcés au Parlement de Provence par un de messieurs les avocats généraux (Volumes 1 and 2, chez Quillau, 1739).
- Gaspard de Gueidan, Discours prononcés au Parlement de Provence par un de messieurs les avocats généraux (Volume 2, 1741).
- Gaspard de Gueidan, Discours prononcés au parlement de Provence (Volume 3, de Nully, 1753).
- Gaspard de Gueidan, Discours prononcés au parlement de Provence (Volume 5, 1762).
