= Ripert =

Ripert is a French surname that may refer to:

- Colette Ripert (1930–1999), French actress
- Éric Ripert (born 1965), French chef, author and television personality
- Émile Ripert (1882–1948), French academic, poet, novelist and playwright.
- François de Ripert-Monclar (1844–1921), French aristocrat, landowner and diplomat
- Georges Ripert (1880–1958), French lawyer, briefly Secretary of State for Public Instruction and Youth
- Jean-Maurice Ripert (born 1953), French diplomat
- Jean-Pierre-François de Ripert-Monclar (1711–1773), French aristocrat, landowner and lawyer
