= Werthmann =

Werthmann is a German surname. Notable people with the surname include:

- Angelika Werthmann (born 1963), Austrian politician
- Lorenz Werthmann (1858–1921), German Roman Catholic priest and social worker
- Martin Werthmann (born 1982), German artist
