= The Kiss of the Muse (after Frillié) =

- Le Baiser de la muse, d'après Frillié (French)
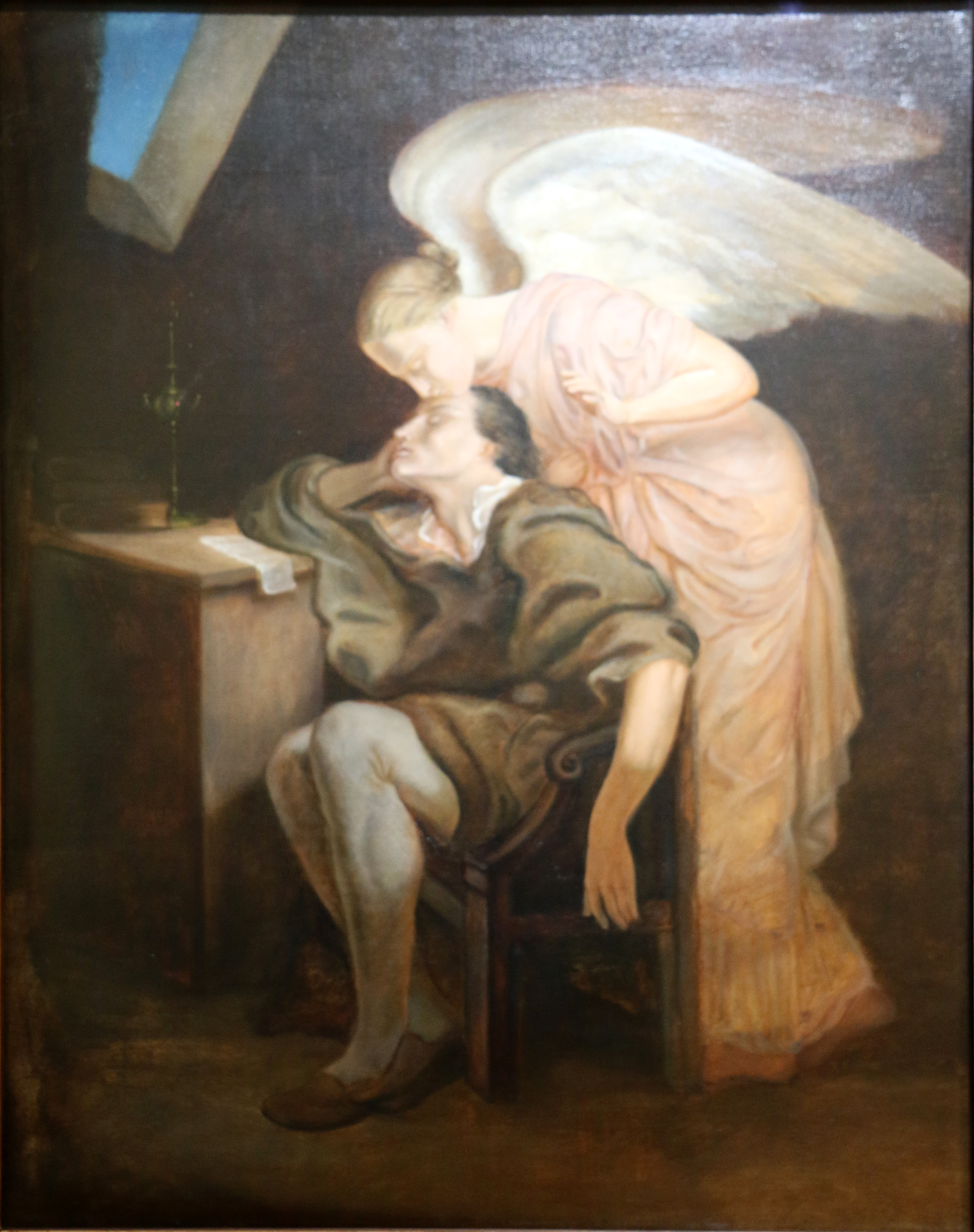
- Artist: Paul Cézanne
- Year: 1859-1860
- Medium: Oil on canvas
- Dimensions: 82 cm × 66 cm (32 in × 26 in)
- Location: Musée Granet, Aix-en-Provence

The Kiss of the Muse (after Frillié) (French: Le Baiser de la muse, d'après Frillié), also known as The Poet's Dream, is an oil painting by French artist Paul Cézanne created between 1859 and 1860. The painting is based on an earlier work by French painter Félix-Nicolas Frillié. It belongs to the collection of the Musée d'Orsay in Paris and is held at the Musée Granet in Aix-en-Provence, France.

== See also ==
- List of paintings by Paul Cézanne
