= Hôtel Silvy =

Coordinates: 43.5250°N 5.4515°E

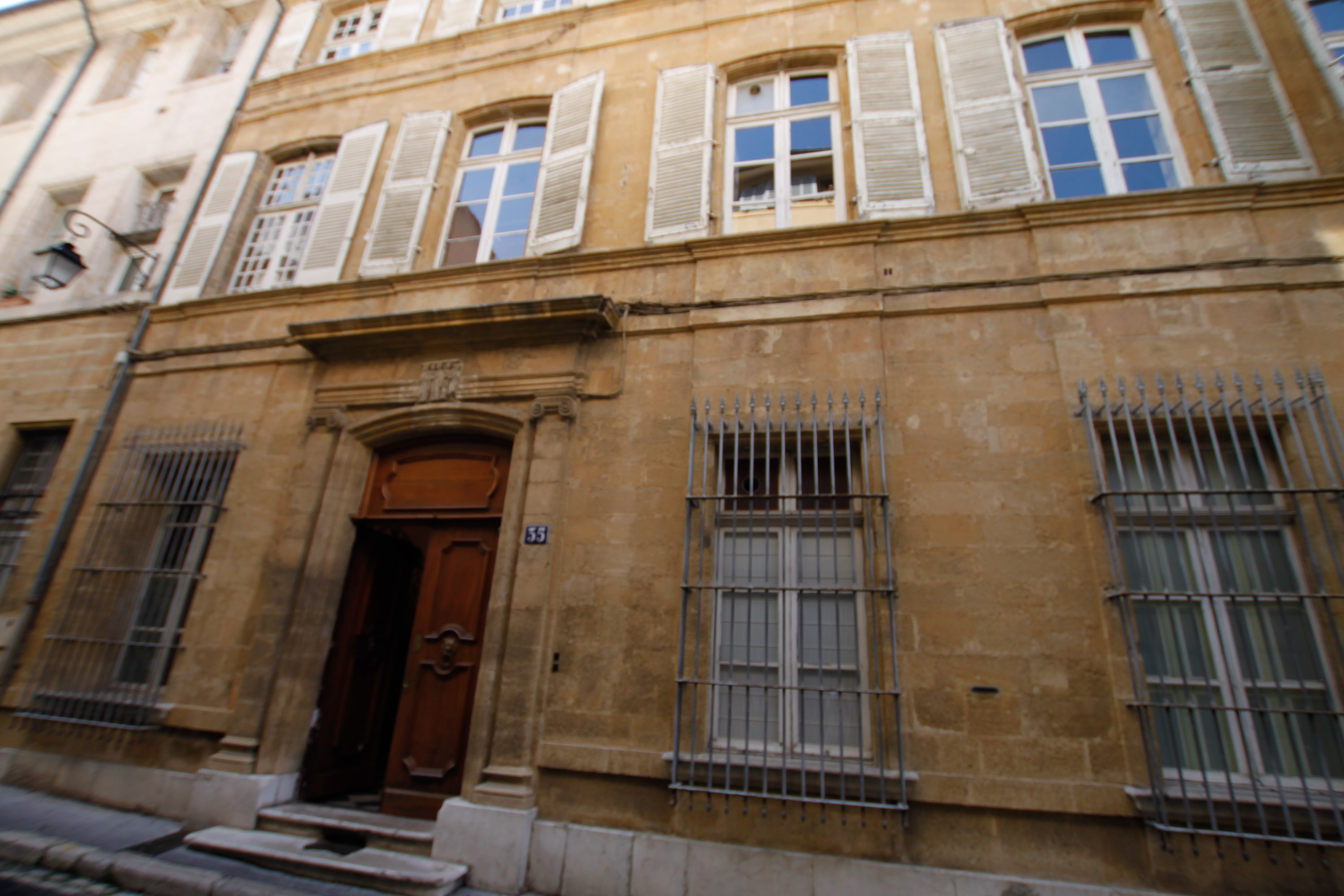
- Interactive map of the Hôtel Silvy area

General information
- Type: Hôtel particulier
- Location: 35, rue Roux Alpheran, Aix-en-Provence, France

The Hôtel Silvy (a.k.a. the Hôtel Ripert de Monclar or the Hôtel Bourguignon de Fabregoules) is a listed hôtel particulier in Aix-en-Provence.

== Location ==
It is located at number 35 on the rue Roux Alpheran in the Quartier Mazarin of Aix-en-Provence.

== History ==
The hotel was built in the seventeenth century for the Silvy family, a family of landowners and magistrates from Aix. In the garden, the fountain was built in the eighteenth century.

It was the private residence of Jean-Pierre-François de Ripert-Monclar (1711-1773) and his wife, Catherine de Lisle. It was later the residence of Jean-Baptiste de Bourguignon de Fabregoules (1746-1838), an art collector who bequeathed his art collection to the Musée Granet in Aix.

== Heritage significance ==
The fountain and the garden have been listed as monuments historiques since 1929. The hotel has been listed as a monument historique since 1984.
