= Jean Planque =

Swiss art collector (1910–1998)

Jean Planque (1910–1998) was a Swiss art collector.

== Biography ==
Jean Planque was born in Ferreyres, Switzerland into a Protestant family of peasants. He began painting in his 20s, developing ten years later as an art expert. In 1948 he moved to the countryside of Montagne Sainte-Victoire near Aix-en-Provence, attracted by the art of Paul Cézanne. After a return to Paris, he lived in Basel, where he became involved with the gallery of Ernst Beyeler. Building on his contacts with curators, collectors and most importantly artists such as Pablo Picasso, Jean Dubuffet and Alberto Giacometti, Planque's skills as an art dealer allowed him to establish his own remarkable collection.

His collection contains around 300 paintings, drawings and sculptures, including works by Cézanne, Picasso, Dubuffet, Pierre Bonnard, Edgar Degas, Paul Gauguin, Claude Monet, Pierre-Auguste Renoir, Vincent van Gogh, Paul Klee, Hans Reichel, Raoul Dufy, Georges Braque, Jean-Paul Laurens and Giacometti. In June 2010, it was temporarily exhibited in the Musée Granet in Aix-en-Provence, with a planned extension for a further 15 years. From 2011 it was installed in an annexe to the Musée Granet, in the nearby deconsecrated Chapelle des Pénitents blancs on Place Jean-Boyer.
