= Hôtel de Gueydan =

Coordinates: 43.5266°N 5.4488°E

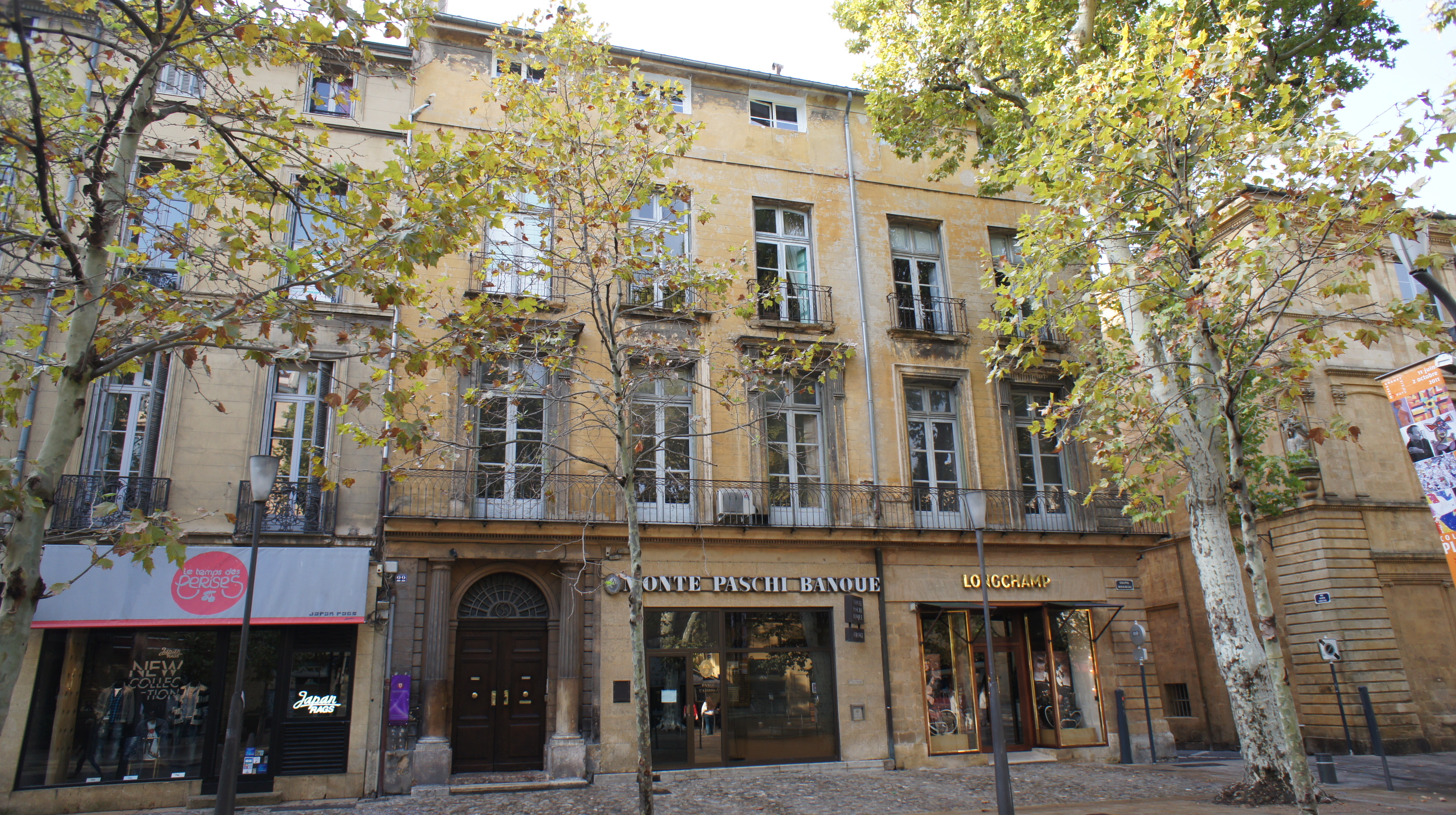
- Interactive map of the Hôtel de Gueydan area

General information
- Type: Hôtel particulier
- Location: 22, Cours Mirabeau, Aix-en-Provence, France

The Hôtel de Gueydan (a.k.a. Hôtel de Gueidan) is a listed hôtel particulier in Aix-en-Provence, Bouches-du-Rhône, France.

== Location ==
It is located at 22, Cours Mirabeau, in the centre of Aix-en-Provence.

== History ==
In 1648, Martin Eyguesier, a lawyer, purchased the parcel of land and build this hotel particulier.

Several decades later, in 1681, it was purchased by Pierre de Gueidan, a wealthy lawyer. His son, Gaspard de Gueidan (de Valabre) (1688-1767) grew up in this hotel.

== Heritage significance ==
It has been listed as a "monument historique" since August 9, 1941.
