= Hôtel de Suffren =

Coordinates: 43.5267°N 5.4502°E

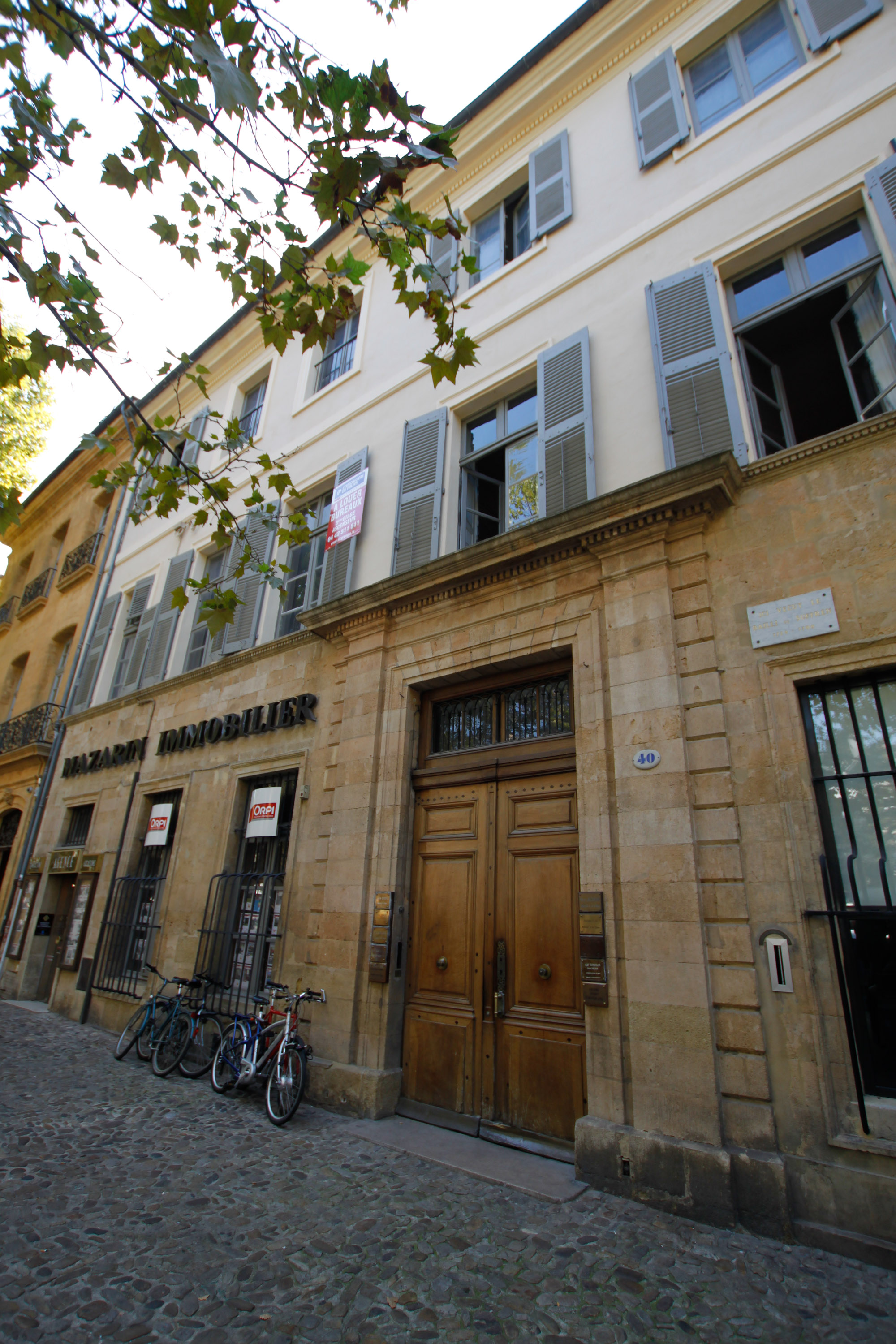
- Interactive map of the Hôtel de Suffren area

General information
- Type: Hôtel particulier
- Location: 40, Cours Mirabeau, Aix-en-Provence, France
- Construction started: 1649
- Completed: 1651

The Hôtel de Suffren (a.k.a. Hôtel Forbin d'Oppède) is a listed hôtel particulier in Aix-en-Provence.

== Location ==
It is located at 40, Cours Mirabeau in Aix-en-Provence.

== History ==
The hotel was built from 1649 to 1651 for Esprit d'Arnaud, who served as an Advisor at the Parlement of Aix-en-Provence. In 1666, his widow and his son sold it to Jules de Ricard, who also served as an Advisor to the Parlement of Aix-en-Provence.

In 1674, it was purchased by Joseph Jean Baptiste Suffren (1651-1737), who served as an Advisor to the King. His grandson, the Bailli de Suffren, Pierre André de Suffren (1729-1788), who was born in Saint-Cannat, spent his childhood in this hotel, as explained on a historical plaque on the facade.

Later, the hotel belonged to the Marquis de Forbin d'Oppède.

More recently, in the 20th century, it belonged to Edouard Jourdan, who was Professor of Law at the University of Provence.

== Heritage significance ==
It has been listed as a "monument historique" since 25 March 1929.

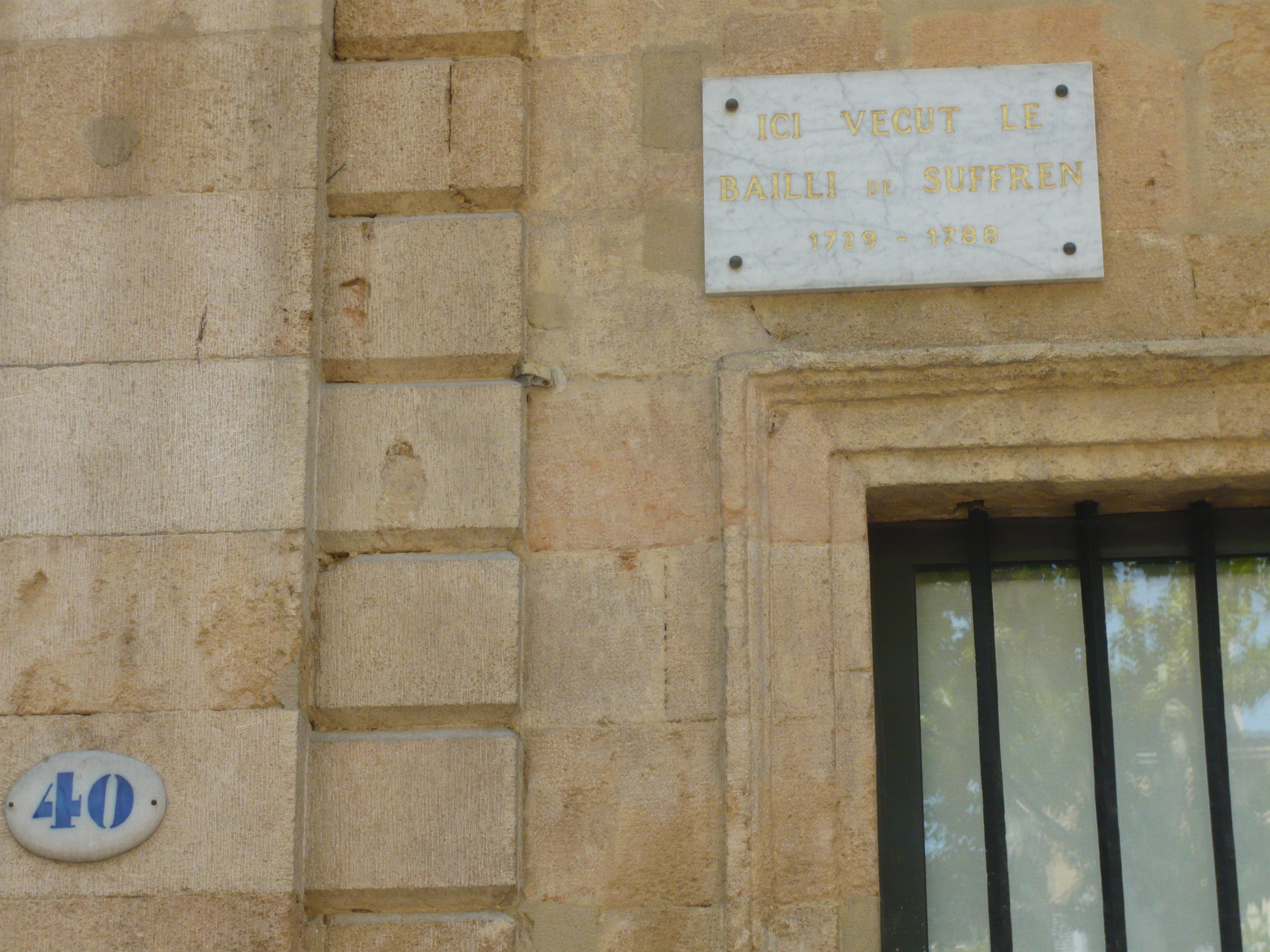
Historical plaque saying "The Bailli de Suffren lived here."
