= Hôtel de Villeneuve d'Ansouis =

Coordinates: 43.5247°N 5.4502°E

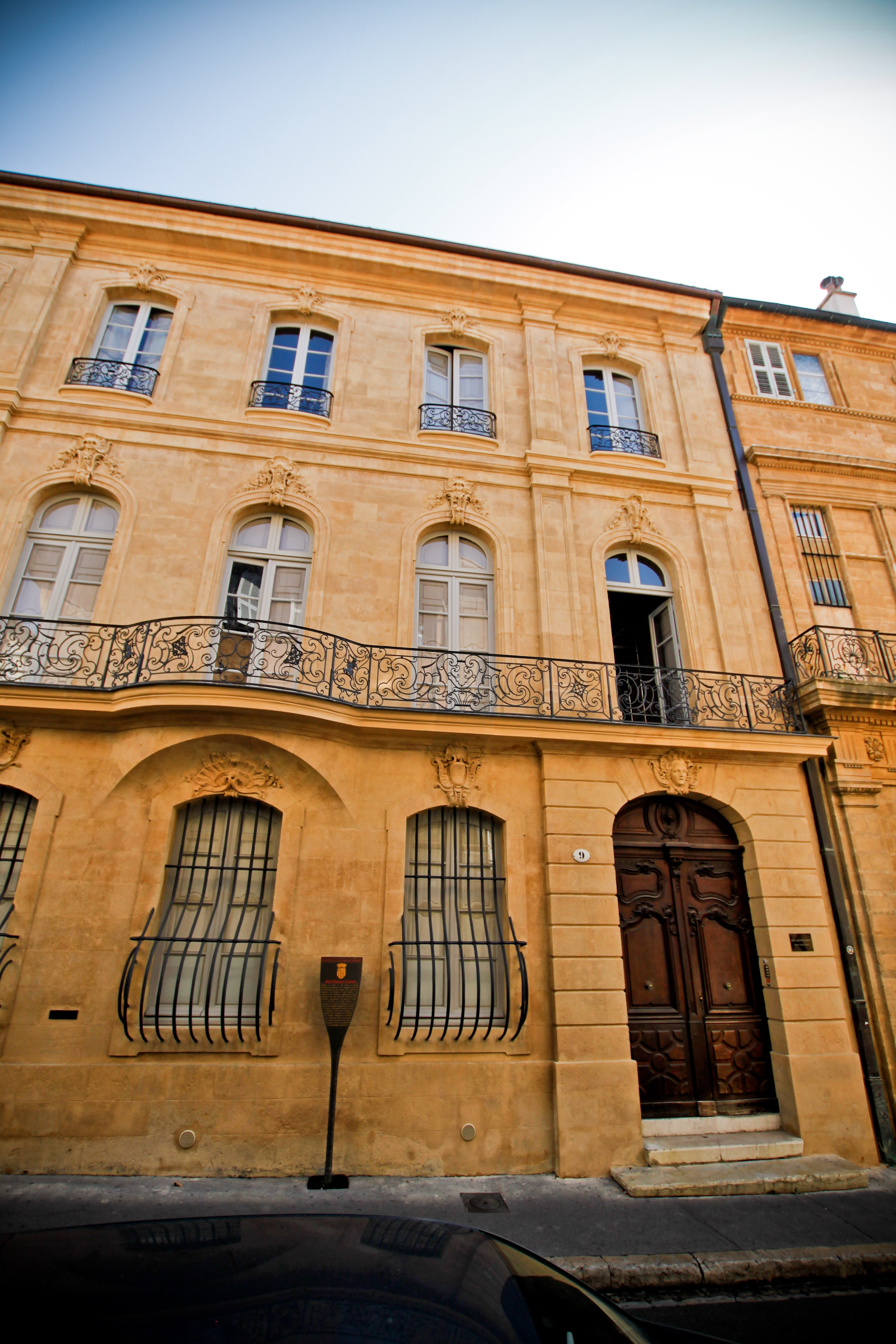
- Facade of the Hôtel de Villeneuve d'Ansouis

General information
- Type: Hôtel particulier
- Location: 9, rue du 4 septembre, Aix-en-Provence, France
- Completed: 1740

Design and construction
- Architect: Georges Vallon (renovated)

The Hôtel de Villeneuve d'Ansouis is a listed hôtel particulier in Aix-en-Provence.

== Location ==
It is located at number 9 on the rue du 4 septembre in the Quartier Mazarin of Aix-en-Provence.

== History ==
The de Villeneuve d'Ansouis family lived in an old house as late as 1695. In 1740, it was torn down and this new hotel particulier was built for Théodore de Villeneuve d'Ansouis, who served as an Advisor to the Parlement of Aix-en-Provence. It was then renovated by Georges Vallon (1688-1767) in 1757. It is three stories high, with wrought iron balconies and mascarons sculpted on the facade. Additionally, the facade has three sets of windows in the center, each of which are surrounded by one window on each side, surrounded in turn by Doric columns. Above the main door, there is a sculpture of a female face, with her hair in the wind.

== Heritage significance ==
It has been listed as a monument historique since December 5, 1984.
