= Jupiter and Thetis =

Painting by Jean-Auguste-Dominique Ingres

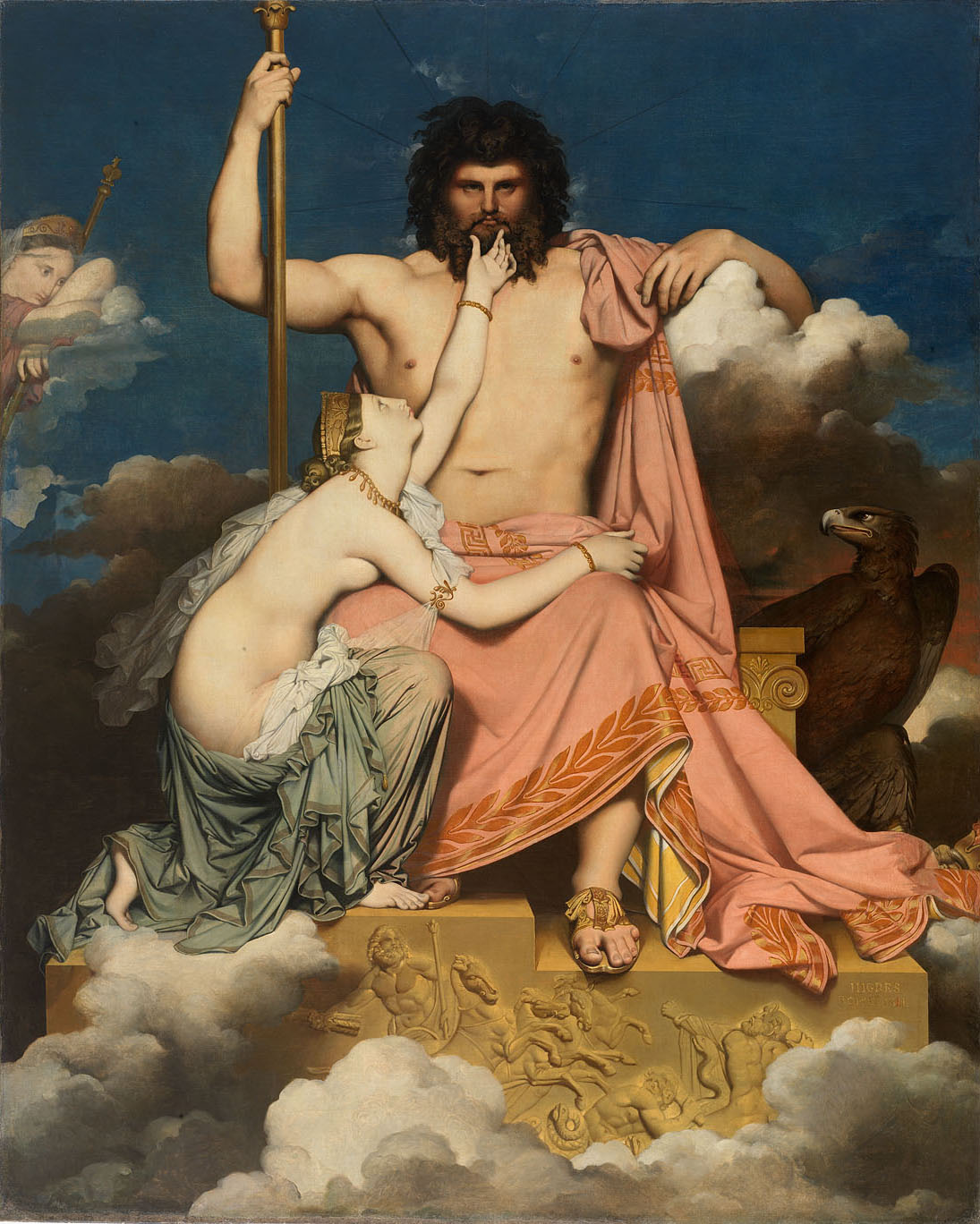
- "She sank to the ground beside him, put her left arm round his knees, raised her right hand to touch his chin, and so made her petition to the Royal Son of Cronos", Iliad 1.500–502
- Artist: Jean-Auguste-Dominique Ingres
- Year: 1811
- Medium: oil on canvas
- Dimensions: 347.03 cm × 257.18 cm (136.625 in × 101.250 in)
- Location: Musée Granet, Aix-en-Provence, France

Jupiter and Thetis is an 1811 painting by the French neoclassical painter Jean-Auguste-Dominique Ingres, in the Musée Granet, Aix-en-Provence, France. Painted when the artist was not yet 31, the work severely and pointedly contrasts the grandeur and might of a cloud-borne Olympian male deity against that of a diminutive and half nude nymph. Ingres' subject matter is borrowed from an episode in Homer's Iliad when the sea nymph Thetis begs Jupiter to intervene and guide the fate of her son Achilles, who was at the time embroiled in the Trojan War.

== Style and subject ==
The painting is steeped in the traditions of both classical and neoclassical art, most notably in its grand scale of 136 5/8 by 101 1/4 inches (3,470 mm × 2,570 mm). Ingres creates many visual contrasts between the god and the slithering nymph: Jupiter is shown facing the viewer frontally with both his arms and legs spread broadly across the canvas, while the color of his dress and flesh echoes that of the marble at his feet. In contrast, Thetis is rendered in sensuous curves and portrayed in supplication to the mercy of a cruel god who holds the fate of her son in his hands. Thetis' right hand falls on Jupiter's hip with a suggestion of erotic caress, while the dark green of her dress accents the dread and foreboding of the bare landscape behind. Her clothing is drawn up against her lower hip, and seems about to fall off. The focal point of the work is Thetis' left hand extended vertically upright as she attempts to stroke the beard of the god.

Jupiter and Thetis, a 1793 engraving by John Flaxman treats the subject matter in a similar tone.

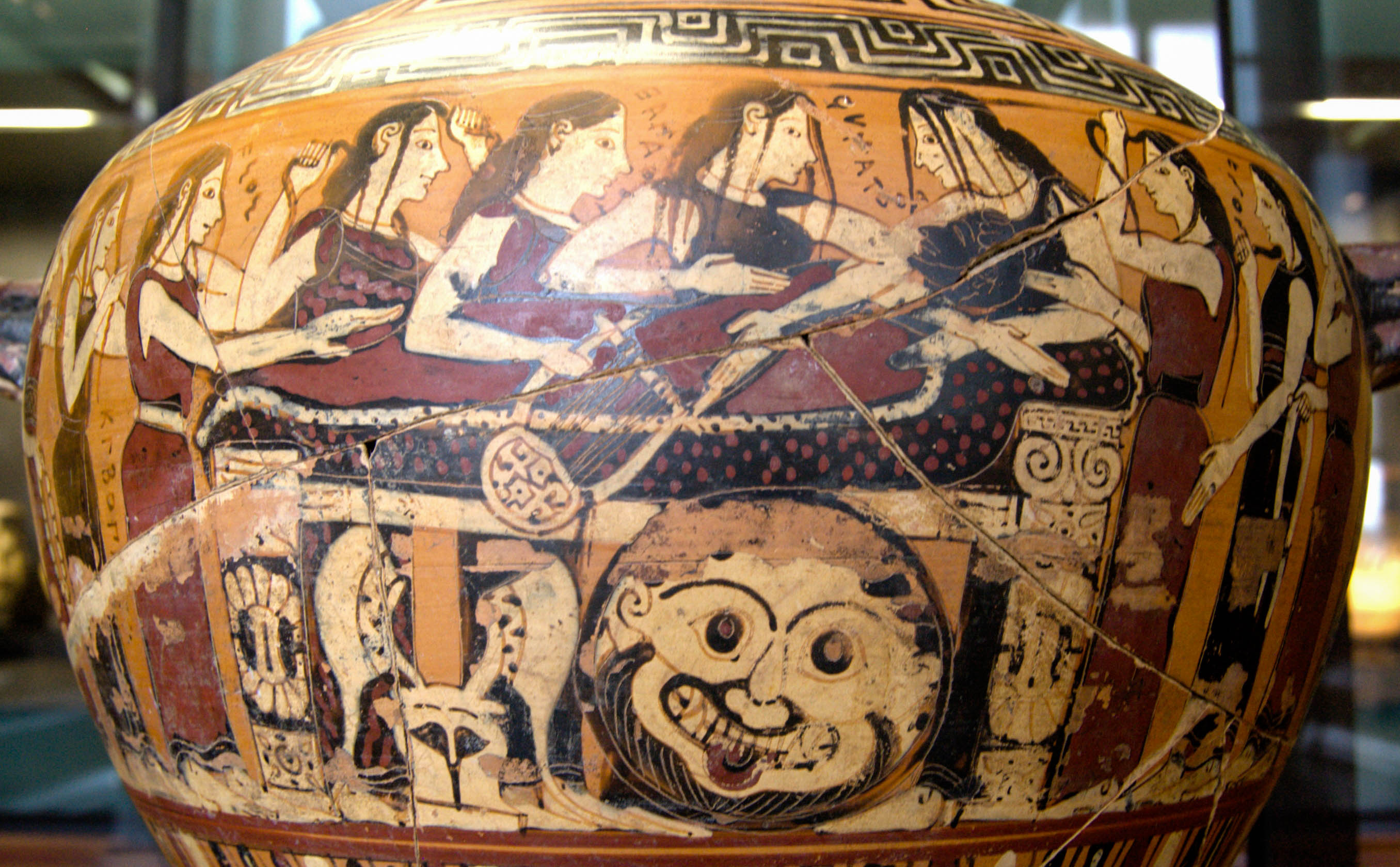
Thetis and the Nereids mourning Achilles, Corinthian black-figure hydria, 560–550 BC; note the Gorgon shield - Louvre

Jupiter's pose is closely based on that of the famous chryselephantine sculpture, the Statue of Zeus at Olympia (Zeus being Jupiter's Greek equivalent), one of the Seven Wonders of the Ancient World. This was made by the Greek sculptor of the Classical period, Phidias, circa 432 BC and destroyed in antiquity, but its pose is known from coins and small replicas. Here the pose is reversed right to left, and the arm to the viewer's right is higher than in the original, which held out a statue of Nike.

Jupiter and Thetis was painted to meet the artist's obligations to the French Academy in Rome, and although its overhand tone correctly reflected the patriarchal bias of Napoleon's regime in its contrast between male power and female subservience, it is generally regarded as a rejection of such values. Ingres highly regarded the painting, and in a manner it marries the great motifs of his career: the voluptuousness of the female character and the authoritative austerity on the male deity.

Ingres kept Jupiter and Thetis in his studio until 1834, when it was purchased by the state. In 1848, he made a single pencil copy. The painting was first exhibited at the 1811 Paris Salon, at a time when Ingres' attention to line coupled with his disregard for anatomical reality was yet to find favour among critics.

== See also ==
- List of paintings by Jean-Auguste-Dominique Ingres

== Sources ==
- Rosenblum, Robert. Ingres. London: Harry N. Abrams, 1990. ISBN 0-300-08653-9
