= Hôtel Maurel de Pontevès =

Coordinates: 43.5269°N 5.4499°E

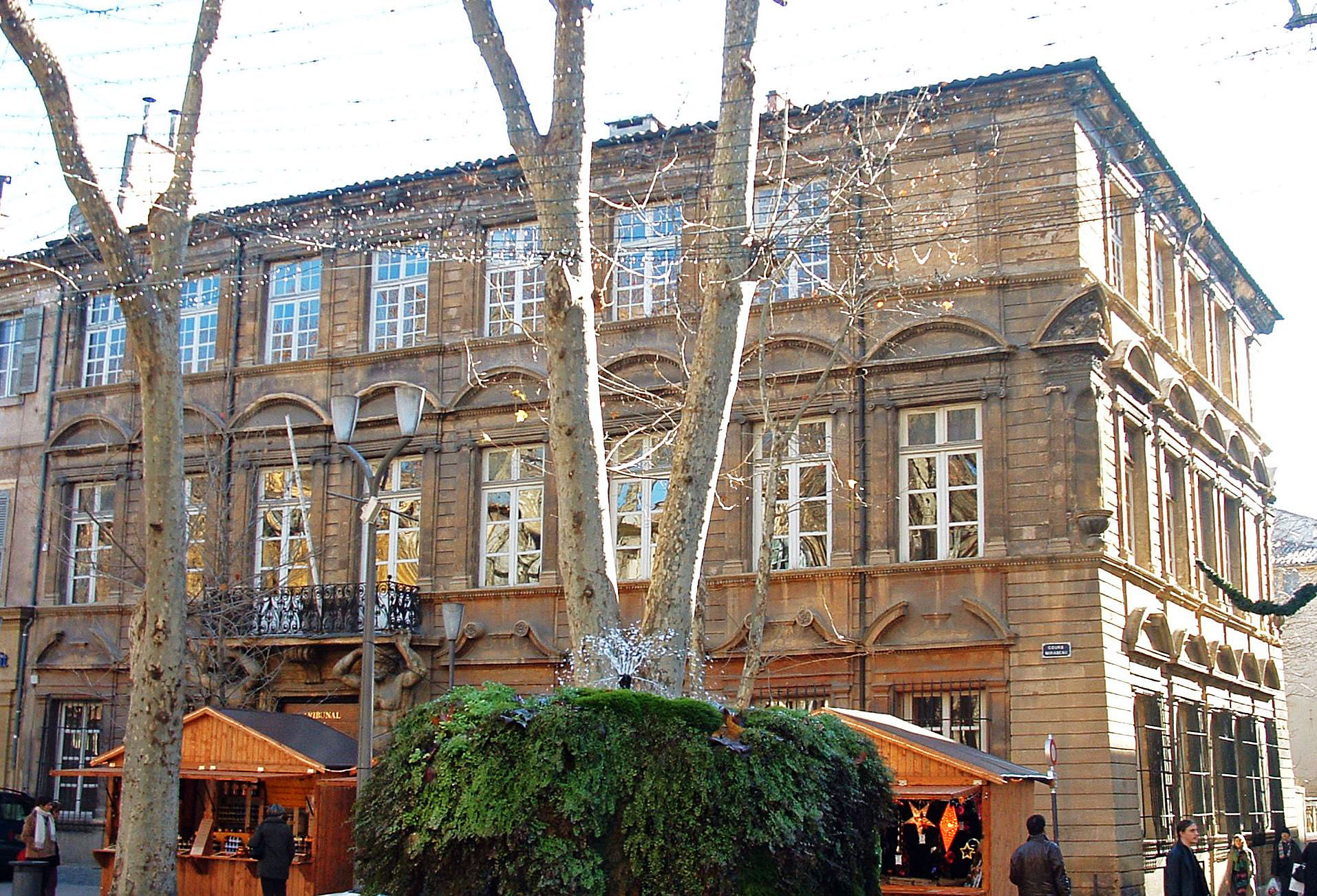
- Interactive map of the Hôtel Maurel de Pontevès area

General information
- Type: Hôtel particulier
- Location: 38, Cours Mirabeau, Aix-en-Provence, France
- Construction started: 1647
- Completed: 1651
- Client: Pierre Maurel

Design and construction
- Architects: Jean Lombard; Pierre Pavillon

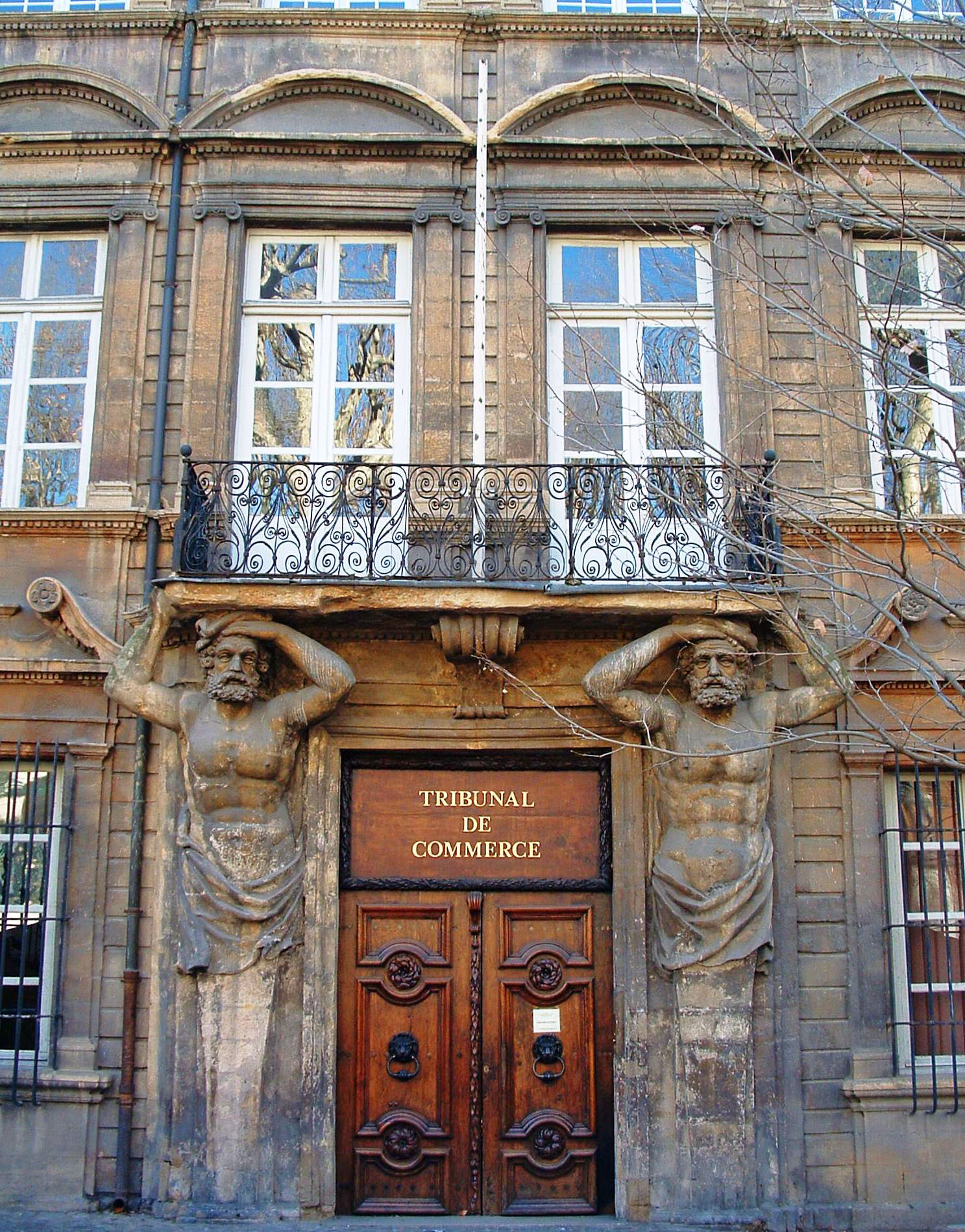
Front door on the Cours Mirabeau.

The Hôtel Maurel de Pontevès (a.k.a. Hôtel d'Espagnet) is a listed hôtel particulier in Aix-en-Provence, Bouches-du-Rhône, France.

== Location ==
The hotel is located at 38 on the Cours Mirabeau in the centre of Aix-en-Provence.

== History ==
The hotel was one of the first hotels to be built in the Quartier Mazarin. Its construction started in 1647, and it was only completed four years later, in 1651. It was designed by architects Jean Lombard and Pierre Pavillon. They combined the architectural styles of mannerism and Baroque architecture.

The first owner was Pierre Maurel, a prosperous cloth merchant who purchased the marquisate of Pontevès.

== Heritage significance ==
It has been listed as a "monument historique" since February 8, 1990.
