= Jean-Pierre-François de Ripert-Monclar =

French aristocrat, landowner and lawyer

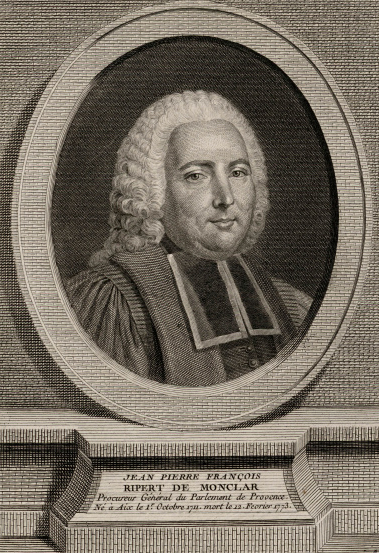
- Born: 1711; Château Royal de Saint-Saturnin, Saint-Saturnin-lès-Apt, Vaucluse, Provence-Alpes-Côte d'Azur, France
- Died: 1773 (aged 61–62); Château Royal de Saint-Saturnin, Saint-Saturnin-lès-Apt, Vaucluse, Provence-Alpes-Côte d'Azur, France
- Occupations: Landowner; Lawyer

Jean-Pierre-François de Ripert-Monclar (1711–1773) was a French aristocrat, landowner and lawyer.

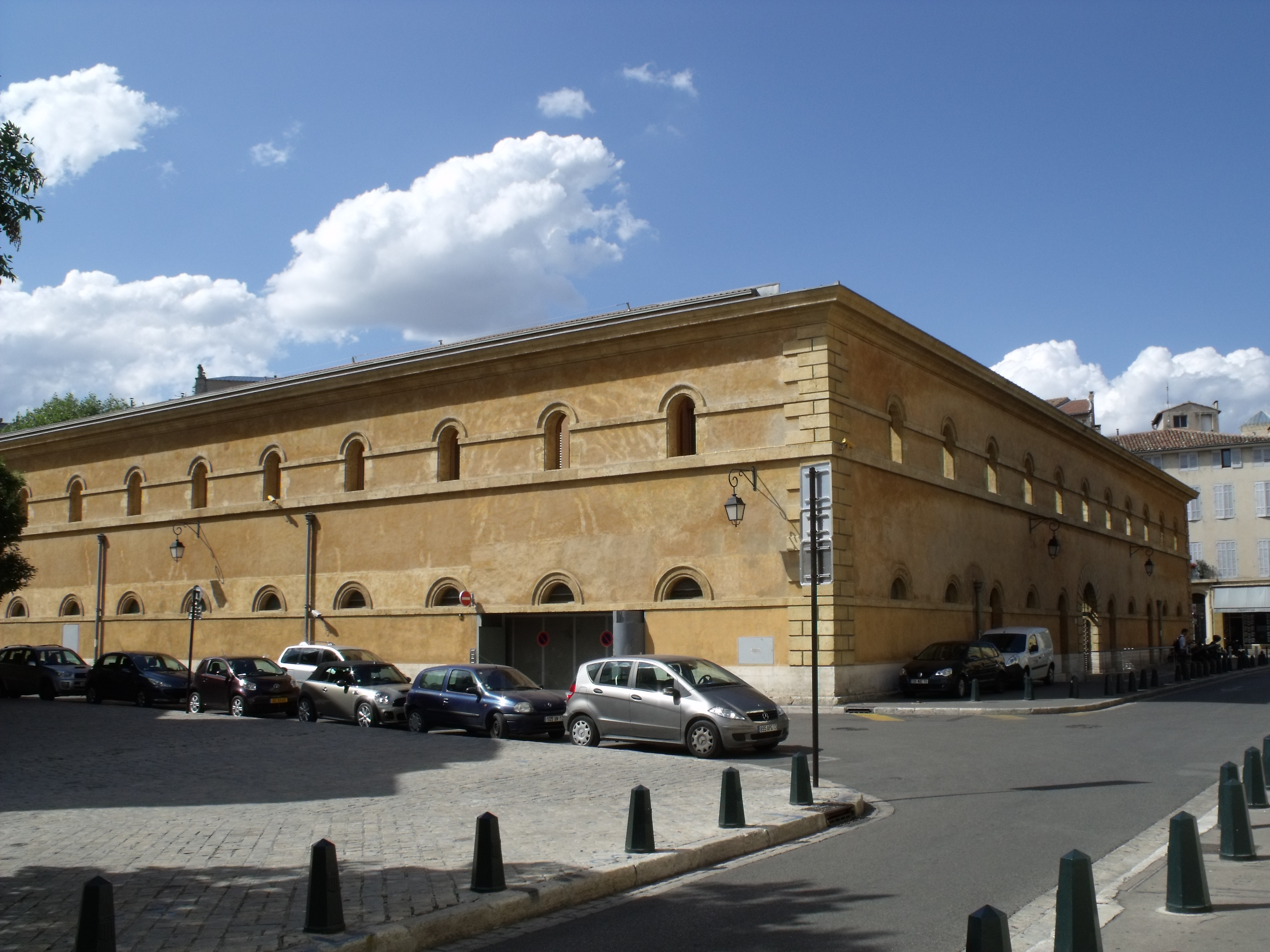
Rue Monclar, along the former prison (now an annex to the Palace of Justice).

== Biography ==
=== Early life ===
Jean-Pierre-François de Ripert-Monclar was born in 1711 in the Château Royal de Saint-Saturnin, a family château in Saint-Saturnin-lès-Apt where his family spent their holidays. His father was General Prosecutor of the Parlement of Aix-en-Provence. He was educated at the College d'Harcourt in Paris.

=== Career ===
A landowner, King Louis XV granted him (and all direct male heir) the marquisate of Monclar in 1769.

Like his father, he served as General Prosecutor of the Parlement of Aix-en-Provence, in 1732. In his 1750 Mémoire théologique et politique sur les mariages clandestins des protestants en France, he expressed his support for legalizing the marriages of Protestants. He was jansenist and opposed to Jesuits, as made clear in his 1762 Compte rendu des constitutions de la Société.

=== Personal life ===
He married Catherine de Lisle, daughter of Pierre-Jean de Lisle, in 1747. They resided in the Hôtel Ripert de Monclar on the Rue Roux-Alphéran in the Quartier Mazarin of Aix-en-Provence. They had a son and a daughter:

- Jules Claude Louis de Ripert-Monclar. He was guillotined on June 19, 1794.
- (daughter) who married Jean-Joseph Spitalieri de Cessole and resided in the Palais d'York in Nice.

He died in 1773 in the Château Royal de Saint-Saturnin in Saint-Saturnin-lès-Apt. François de Ripert-Monclar (1844-1921) was his descendant.

=== Legacy ===
The Rue Monclar in Aix-en-Provence is named in his honour.

== Bibliography ==
- Jean-Pierre-François Ripert de Monclar, Mémoire théologique et politique sur les mariages clandestins des protestants en France (1750).
- Jean-Pierre-François Ripert de Monclar, Mémoire sur le commerce des cuirs (1759).
- Jean-Pierre-François Ripert de Monclar, Compte rendu des constitutions de la Société (1762).
