= Hôtel de Simiane =

Coordinates: 43.5255°N 5.4478°E

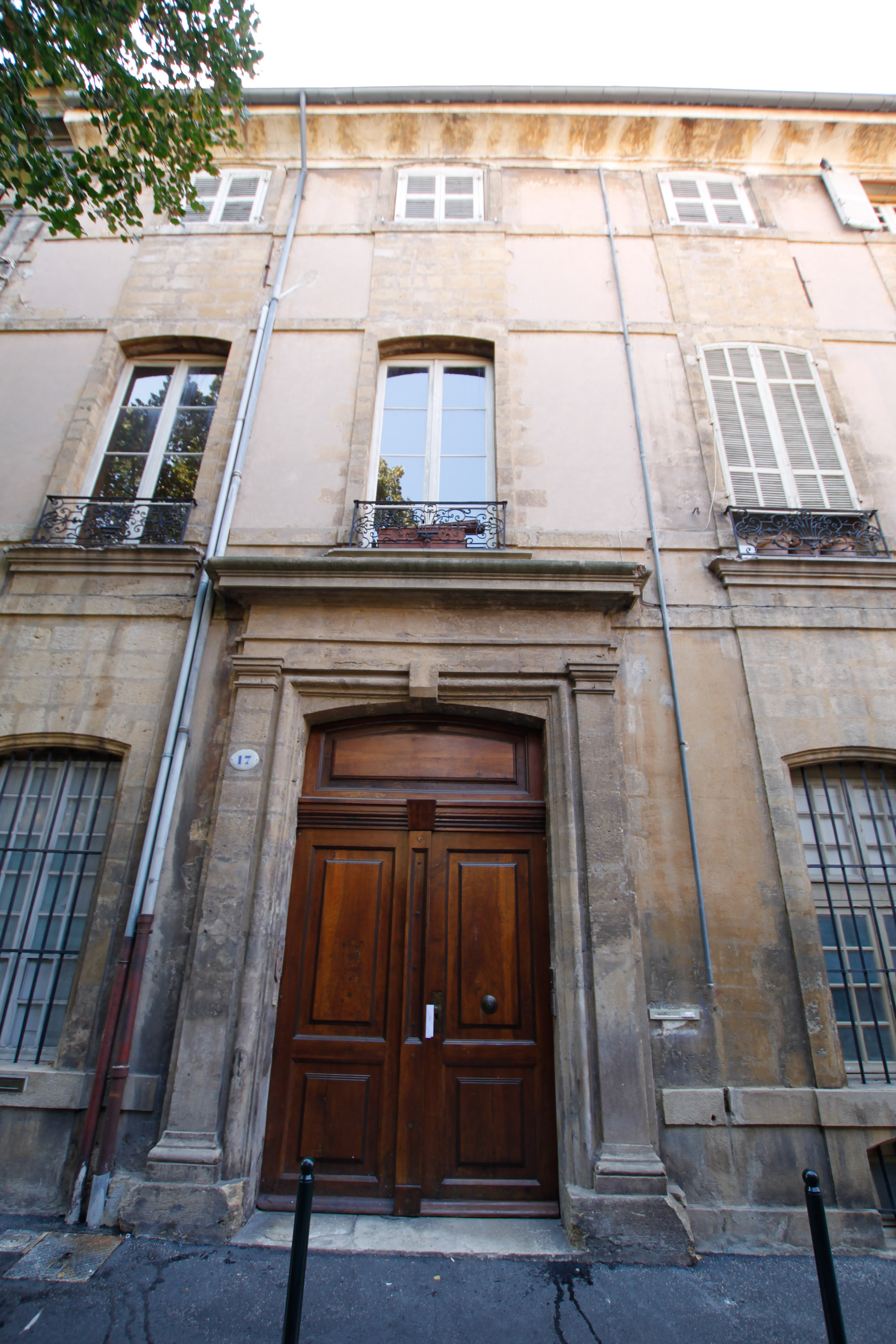
- Interactive map of the Hôtel de Simiane area

General information
- Type: Hôtel particulier
- Location: 17, rue Goyrand, Aix-en-Provence, France

Design and construction
- Architect: Thomas Lainée

The Hôtel de Simiane (a.k.a. "Hôtel de Grignan Simiane") is a listed hôtel particulier in Aix-en-Provence.

== Location ==
It is located at number 17 on the Rue Goyrand in the Quartier Mazarin of Aix-en-Provence.

== History ==
It was designed by architect Thomas Lainée (1682-1739) in the seventeenth century. It includes wallpapers by Claude-Joseph Vernet (1714–1789). It has three stories. Outside, it has a fountain with a fountain.

It was the private residence of Françoise-Marguerite de Sévigné (1646–1705) and her husband François Adhémar de Monteil, Comte de Grignan (1632–1714). Their daughter, Pauline de Simiane (1676-1737), sold it to another private owner in 1730.

== Heritage significance ==
It has been listed as a monument historique since 1 July 1989.
