= Pietro Ruffo (artist) =

Italian contemporary artist (born 1978)

- Born: 1978 (age 47–48); Rome, Italy
- Known for: drawing, painting, sculpture
- Movement: Contemporary Art
- Website: pietroruffo.com

Pietro Ruffo (born 1978) is an Italian contemporary artist.

== Life and work ==
Originally introduced to art by his grandfather, Ruffo became an artist's apprentice at the age of fourteen, working for two years before setting up his own studio in the countryside of Filacciano. He graduated with a degree in architecture from the University of Rome in 2005 and moved to the Ex Pastificio Cerere in San Lorenzo, a historic artist's residence.

In 2005, Ruffo travelled to Beslan, Russia, to work with children who survived the massacre at their local school by Chechen rebels. Immediately following the event, the artist worked as an art therapist, running workshops for the child survivors of the Beslan massacre. His time spent in Beslan inspired a major work entitled, Beslan doppia mappatura (Beslan Double Mapping) 2006, which illustrates the destroyed classrooms and surviving children. In 2011, Ruffo was selected for The Premio New York fellowship at Columbia University. The research conducted during his time there served as the foundation for his series entitled, “The Political Gymnasium” which centres on the politico-philosophical writings and arguments of Robert Nozick.
