= François de Ripert-Monclar =

French aristocrat, landowner and diplomat

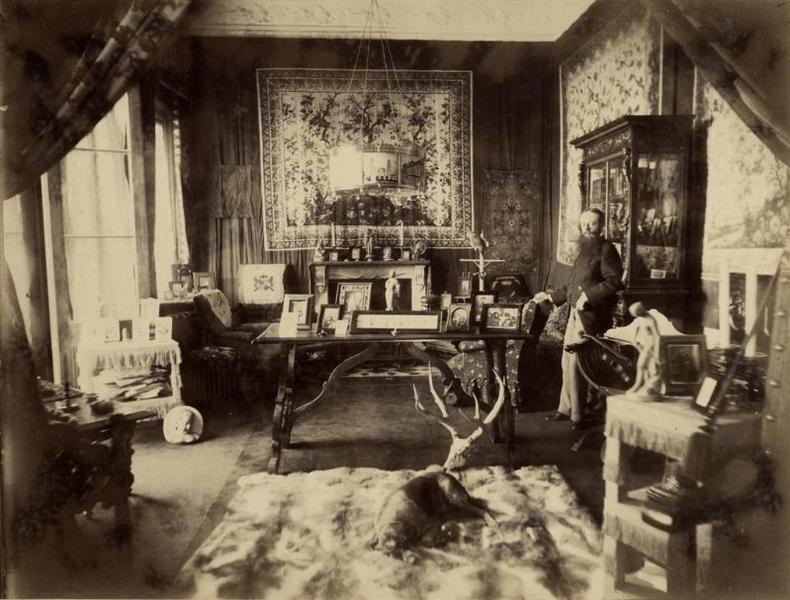
- de Ripert-Monclar in his drawing-room
- Born: 31 May 1844; Paris, France
- Died: 20 January 1921 (aged 76); Allemagne-en-Provence, Alpes-de-Haute-Provence, Provence-Alpes-Côte d'Azur, France
- Occupations: Landowner; Diplomat

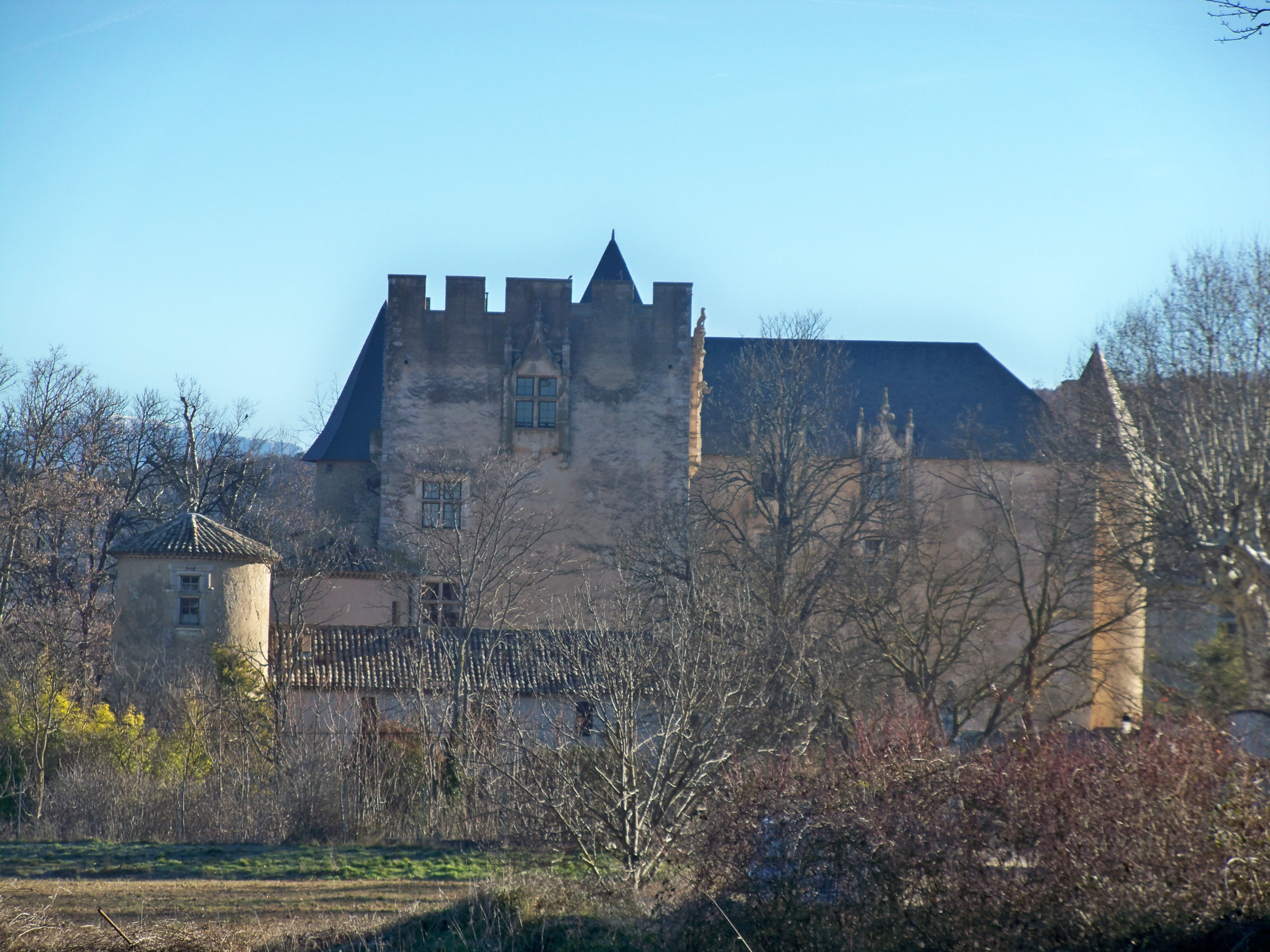
Castle in Allemagne-en-Provence

François de Ripert-Monclar (1844–1921) was a French aristocrat, landowner and diplomat.

== Early life ==
François de Ripert-Monclar was born on 31 May 1844. He came from an aristocratic family: his ancestor Jean-Pierre-François de Ripert-Monclar (1711-1773) had been granted the marquisate of Monclar in 1769 by King Louis XV (inherited by all direct male heirs).

Ripert-Monclar graduated from the École Nationale des Chartes in 1865, with a thesis entitled "Essai sur la domination des empereurs d'Allemagne en Dauphiné et en Provence au moyen âge" ("Essay on the domination of the emperors of Germany in the Dauphiné and in Provence in the Middle Ages").

== Career ==
Ripert-Monclar worked as a career diplomat. He served as embassy Secretary in Mexico, Lima and Santiago. He then served as Consul in Tiflis, Bremen, Stuttgart and Florence. Later, he served as Consul General in Montevideo, Amsterdam and Havana. He then served as plenipotentiary minister (similar to Ambassador) to Venezuela.

Ripert-Monclar was a Commander of the Legion of Honour. He was also an amateur photographer, and his photographic work was exhibited posthumously. They are displayed in the Musée de Salagon in Mane.

== Personal life and death ==
In 1908, he married his cousin, Françoise de Ripert de Barret (1852-1936), daughter of Gustave de Ripert de Barret d'Artaud de Montauban and widow of Ernest Quarré de Verneuil (1839-1907). They resided in his family castle in Allemagne-en-Provence. He died there on 20 January 1921. His widow died in 1936. He had no heir, and his estate (including his castle) went to charity.

== Bibliography ==
- François de Ripert-Monclar, Cartulaire de la commanderie de Richerenches, de l'Ordre du Temple.
