= Marcello Geppetti =

Italian photographer (1933–1998)

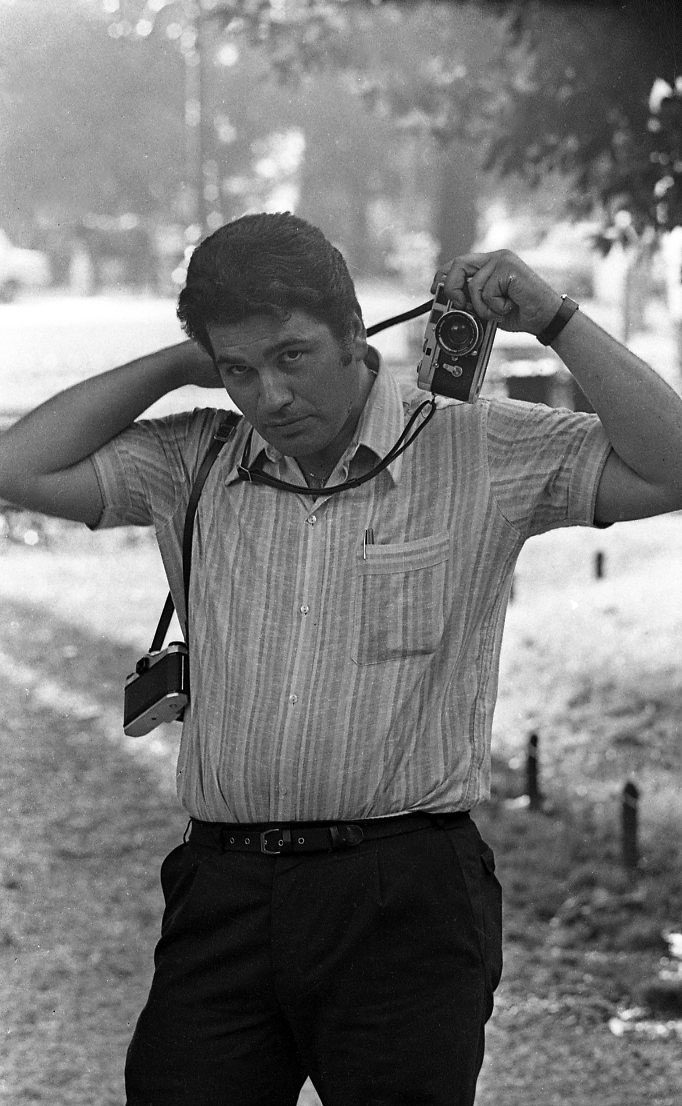
- Marcello Geppetti during Seventies-Eighties. Photo by Andrea Nemiz © MGMC.
- Born: 1933; Rieti, Kingdom of Italy
- Died: 1998 (aged 64–65); Rome, Italy
- Occupations: Reporter; photographer
- Years active: 1958–1998

Marcello Geppetti (1933–1998) was an Italian photographer.

== "The most underrated photographer in history" ==
This is how David Schonauer, the editor in chief of American Photo magazine, described Geppetti in 1997 during an exhibition at New York's Robert Miller Gallery. The New York Times and Newsweek compare him to Cartier-Bresson and Weegee.

Two of his shots (the kiss between Elizabeth Taylor and Richard Burton and Anita Ekberg shooting arrows at the photographers) were considered among the thirty most famous photos and his name appears (is listed) next to those of Andy Warhol and Cecil Beaton.

Nevertheless, the archive of over a million photographs by Geppetti has remained largely unexplored and only a small part of its cultural and artistic potential has been exploited. In 2010, this prompted the heirs to begin a systematic rearranging of the archive.

== Biography ==
Geppetti got started at the Giuliani and Rocca's agency, then he worked at Meldolesi-Canestrelli-Bozzer one of the most important agencies of the 1950s and 1960s. In that period he took the distressing photo of some women who threw themselves into the void while the Ambassadors Hotel was on fire in Via Veneto, in Rome; the photos were so strong and intense that they went all over the world.

He was a member of a group of photographers that inspired Federico Fellini to create the character of a news photographer named Paparazzo in the film La Dolce Vita in 1960.

When he didn't like working anymore as an employee, Geppetti began working as a freelance, working closely for ten years with the Momento Sera, one of the most important newspaper at that time.

During the "Dolce Vita" years he took epoch-making photographs, among the others the first Brigitte Bardot's nude and the kiss between Liz Taylor and Richard Burton – both married to others at the time, but his activity goes on over the student protest and Italian period of terrorism called "anni di piombo". However Geppetti kept on liking taking society and daily life photos.

Their photographs are published on Time Magazine, Life, Vogue, Donna Karan and are exhibited in some galleries in Rome, Milan, London, Lisbon, São Paulo, Saint Petersburg, New York, San Francisco, St. Tropez, Mosca, Toronto, Haifa, Madrid, Metz. His pictures have sold at Sotheby's auction house.

In 2010, for the fiftieth anniversary of the movie La dolce vita, 120 pictures among the most fascinating was exhibited at National Museum of Cinema in Turin.

Geppetti took his last photo on 27 February 1998. He had taken and filed more than a million photos.

== Selected images ==
- Anita Ekberg holding a bow for her arrows, angrily confronts freelance photographers, Rome, 1961
- Audrey Hepburn shopping in a bakery, Rome, 1961
- Anna Magnani walking along Via Veneto, Rome, 1961
- First Kiss – Liz Taylor and Richard Burton, Ischia, 1962
- Brigitte Bardot sunbathing in her villa on Via Appia, Rome, 1962
- John Lennon, Rome, 1965
- Raquel Welch e Marcello Mastroianni on the set of "Shoot loud, louder...", Rome, 1966

== Bibliography ==
- "Gli anni della dolce vita" – ed. Museo Nazionale del Cinema – 2010. ISBN 978-88-96469-03-3.
- "The Beatles in Rome 1965" Curato da: Merola A. – ed. Azimut – 2005. ISBN 978-88-6003-008-5.
- (13.11.1959) LaStampa – numero 270
- (21.10.1960) StampaSera – numero 252
- (2.07.2010) Repubblica Bologna – Cronaca
- American Heritage Magazine – "Overrated & Underrated Photographer" BY DAVID SCHONAUER (David Schonauer is the editor in chief of American Photo magazine)
- (22 September 1997) Newsweek, "Cutting to the Chase" by Peter Plagens
- (11 giugno 2004) – Corriere della Sera – Pagina 49 / "«Codice penale» e gli altri, storie eroiche di paparazzi" di Colonnelli Lauretta
- (1 September 2009) "Caught in the act: the original paparazzi star"/ The Times – Visual Arts
