= Palais d'York =

Historic mansion in Nice, France

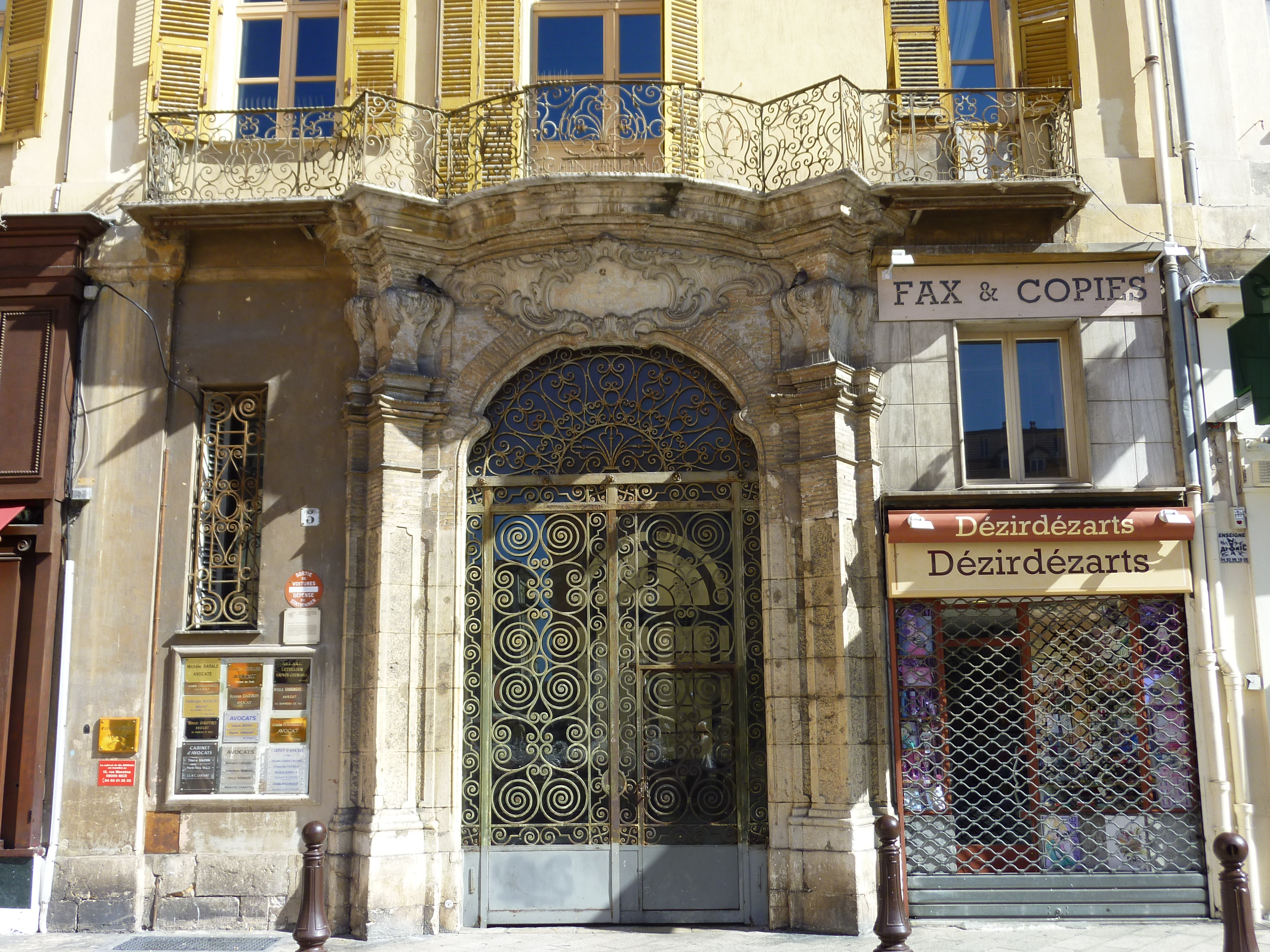
- Palais d'York
- Interactive map of the Palais d'York area

General information
- Type: Mansion
- Location: Nice, Alpes-Maritimes, France
- Coordinates: 43.6970°N 7.2739°E
- Construction started: 1762
- Completed: 1768

The Palais d'York is a historic mansion in Nice, Alpes-Maritimes, France. It was built from 1762 to 1768. It has been listed as an official national monument since December 16, 1949.
