= Martin Werthmann =

German artist (born 1982)

"Diamant-Atem-Maschine", 2021

Martin Werthmann (born 9 May 1982) is a German artist, who is living and working in Berlin.

== Career ==
Martin Werthmann studied from 2004 to 2009 at the University of Fine Arts Hamburg with Andreas Slominski. His teachers also included Wim Wenders, Fatih Akin and Daniel Richter.

== Works ==
Martin Werthmann mainly comprises large format wood block prints, which consist of several overlapping layers and are printed as unique pieces. The topics often circle around catastrophes, mostly transmitted from found photos. Beside his pictorial works, Werthmann creates large scale installations, like the piece Vortex from 2014, a water vortex with a diameter of six meters that the observer could enter through the center. In 2019, he created his first scenery for Korngold's Die tote Stadt, directed by Armin Petras and musical direction by Yoel Gamzou, which was discussed widely in German newspapers.

== Exhibitions (selection) ==
- 2021 "Catastrophy as Space", Heldenreizer Contemporary, Munich, Germany (solo)
- 2020 Martin Werthmann, Wilding Cran Gallery, Los Angeles, California, USA (solo)
- 2019 "Silence", Heldenreizer Contemporary, Munich, Germany (solo)
- 2019 "Silence after Storm", Gallery Tore Suessbier, Berlin, Germany (solo)
- 2018 Löwenpalais Berlin, Germany (group)
- 2017 "D Picture", Wilding Cran Gallery, Los Angeles, California, USA (group)
- 2016 "Martin Werthmann: Anhaltender Regen", Institut of Modern Art, Nuremberg, Germany (solo)
- 2016 "Martin Werthmann: Connected Bubbles", Wilding Cran Gallery, Los Angeles, California, USA (solo)
- 2014 "Sleepless Cheerleaders", McNamara Art Projects, Hong Kong, China (solo)
- 2012 "folie à deux", Gallery Etemad, Tehran, Iran (solo)
- 2011 "Undoubtedly", Kasseler Kunstverein, Kassel, Germany (group)

== Bibliography ==
- Martin Werthmann, Catastrophe as Space, by Hirmer Publishers, with contribution of: Norman Rosenthal, Barbara Scheuermann, Andrew Berardini, Hubertus Günther, Sarah Diefenthaler, Marcus Trautner, Munich 2021, ISBN 978-3-7774-3716-3
- Martin Werthmann: SILENCE, published by Marcus Trautner, Munich, 2019, ISBN 978-3-9819524-5-2
