= Musée Granet =

Museum in Aix-en-Provence, France

Coordinates: 43.5254°N 5.4527°E

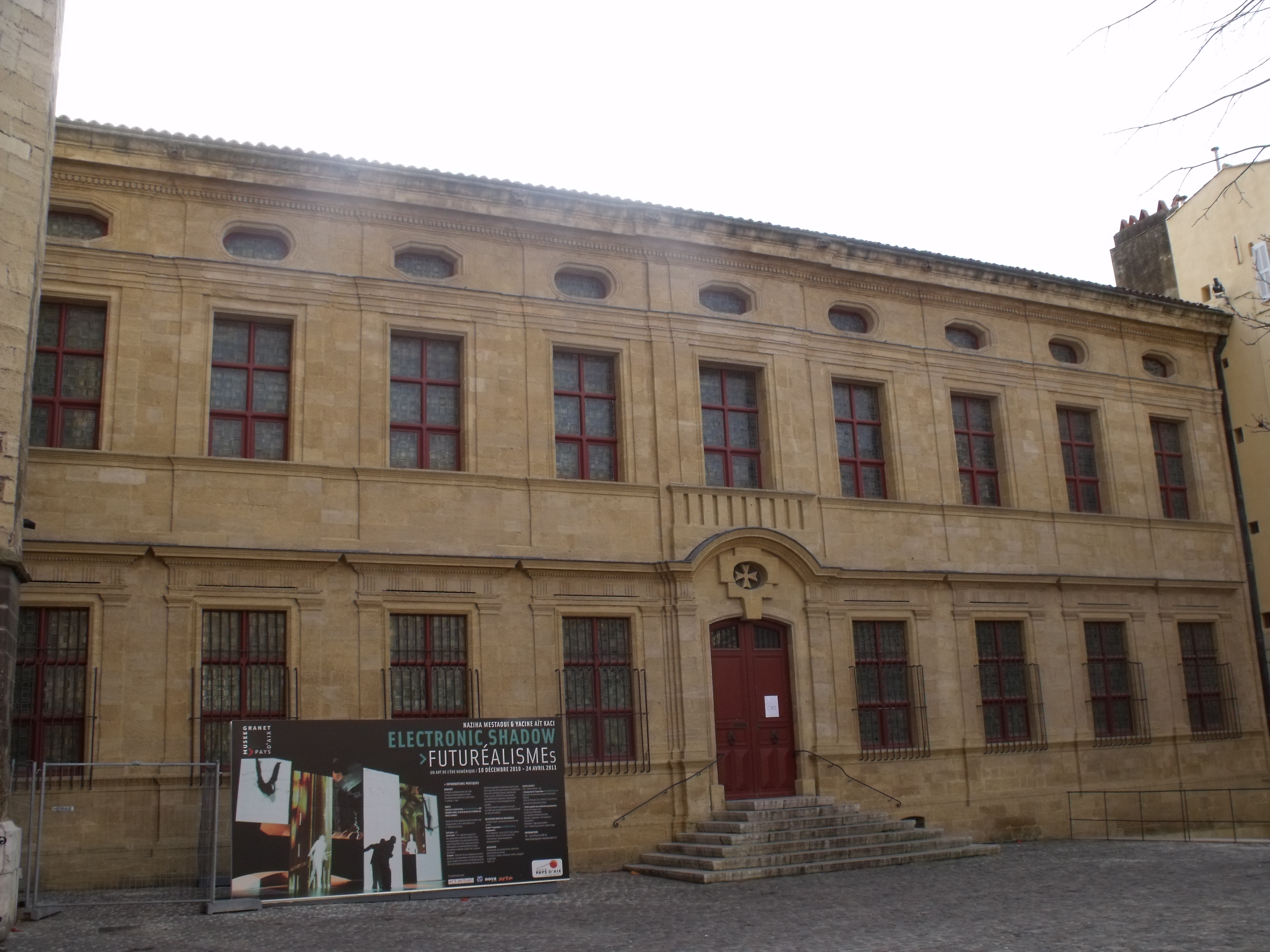
Facade of the Musée Granet

The Musée Granet is a museum in the quartier Mazarin, Aix-en-Provence, France devoted to painting, sculpture and archeology.

In 2021, the museum received 105, 012 visitors.

== History ==
The museum, adjacent to the Church of Saint-Jean-de-Malte, first opened under the name Musée d’Aix in 1838 in buildings previously belonging to the priory of Saint-Jean-de-Malte. It still shares a common garden with the church.

The original collection comes mainly from antiquities collected by Fauris de Saint-Vincens at the end of the eighteenth century. In 1849 the painter François Marius Granet (1775–1849) bequeathed all the paintings and drawings in his possession to his hometown. Two hundred of the drawings were chosen for the Louvre Museum, in accordance with the terms of his will.

The collections were supplemented by various donations: in 1863, Jean-Baptiste de Bourguignon de Fabregoules bequeathed more than eight hundred works of art.

Construction of the Granet wing began in 1860. A second building followed in 1870, a third in 1900, and the complex was completed around 1940. In 1949, on the 100th anniversary of Granet's death, the museum was renamed and has carried his name ever since.

The national museums gave nine works by Paul Cézanne to the Granet Museum in 1984, since the master of Aix was not represented in the museum's collections. Important works of the 20th century were donated to the museum by Philippe Meyer, a private collector and physicist.

== Permanent collection ==
It recently underwent significant restoration and reorganization, prior to the international exhibition in 2006 marking the centenary of Cézanne's death.

=== Archeology ===
A set of pieces from archaeological excavations carried out in the Aix region has been grouped and is exhibited in the museum, in particular, artefacts unearthed at the Entremont oppidum. Due to a lack of space, the large archeological collection, including many recent discoveries, will be displayed in a new museum.

=== Sculpture ===
The sculpture gallery exhibits ancient works, such as a marble mask of a woman by Francesco Laurana as well as sculptures by Alberto Giacometti including Woman of Venice III. A marble bust of Granet by the Lyon sculptor Jean-François Legendre-Héral was given to the museum in 1895.

Among the sculptures of the twentieth century, L'Homme qui chavire by Giacometti is on loan from the Musée d'Orsay.

=== Egyptian collection ===
The Granet Museum houses a rich Egyptian collection, largely assembled in the 19th century through donations and bequests of antiquities, reflecting the tastes of Aix-en-Provence scholars. Several collectors were particularly important, such as Fauris de Saint-Vincent, François Sallier, François-Marius Granet, and Jean-Baptiste Bourguignon de Fabregoules, all of whom contributed to enriching the museum's holdings. Today, this collection is characterized by its richness and variety: reliefs, stelae, statues, amulets, vases, sarcophagi, and even mummies. The sarcophagus of Ptahirdis and the stela of Isetemdinakht are among the many masterpieces preserved by the museum.

=== Paintings ===
The museum contains major paintings by Jean-Dominique Ingres (among which the monumental "Jupiter and Thetis"), an authentic self-portrait by Rembrandt and works by Anthony van Dyck, Paul Cézanne, Alberto Giacometti and Nicolas de Staël.

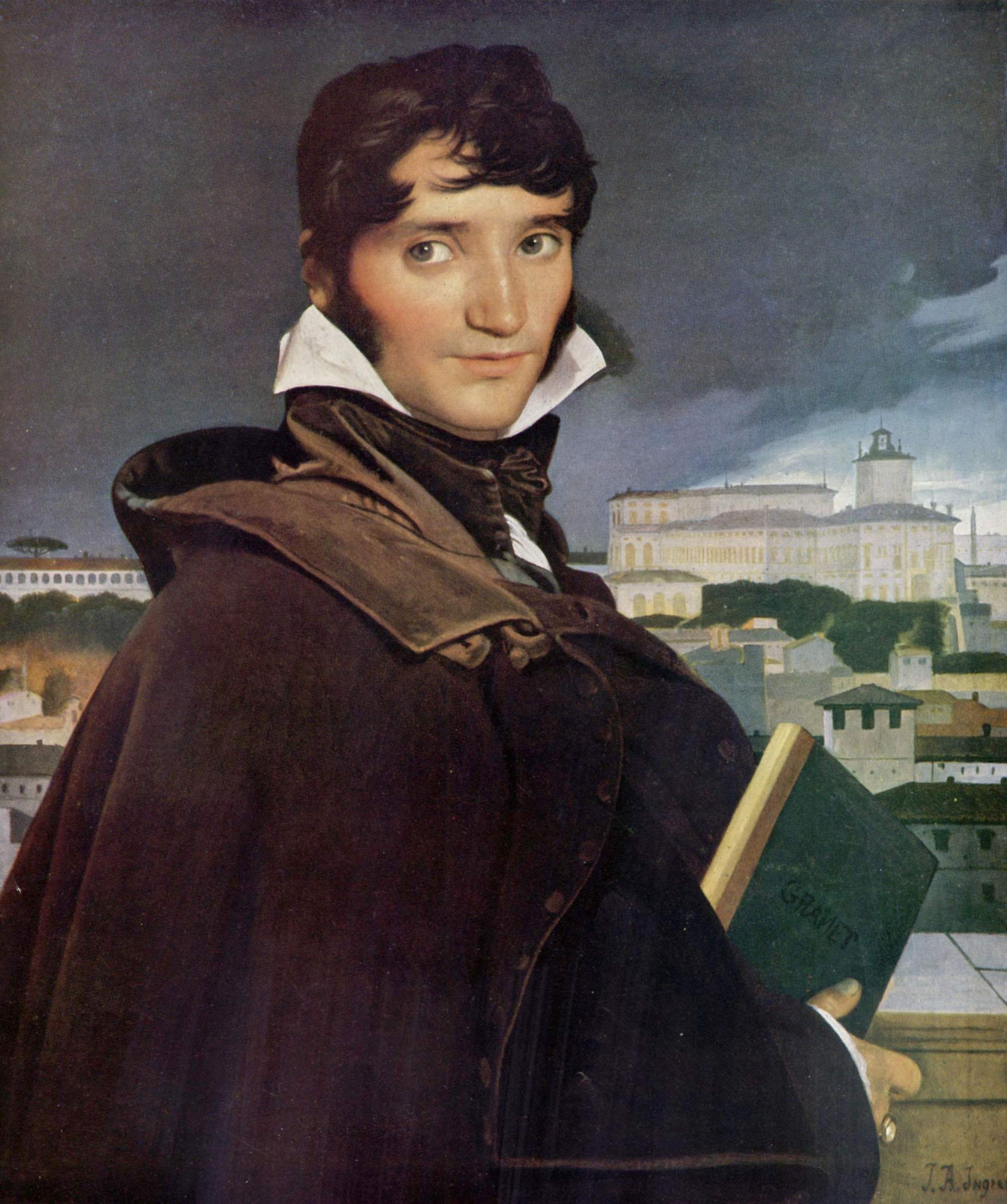
Jean Auguste Dominique Ingres: Portrait of François Marius Granet, donor of the museum's core collection

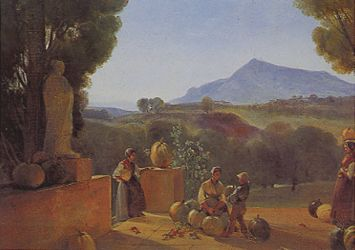
François Marius Granet: Pumpkin harvesting at Malvalat

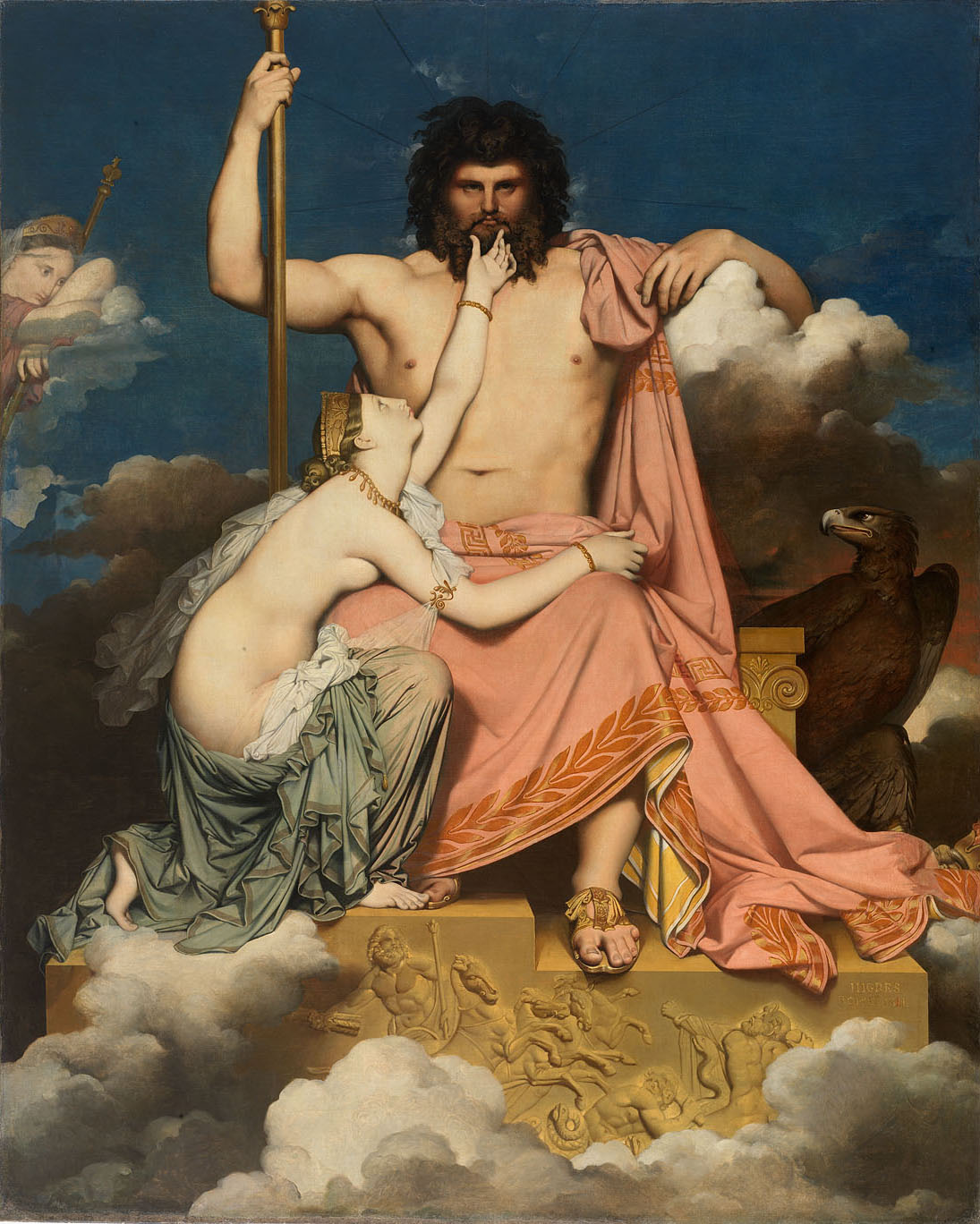
Jean Auguste Dominique Ingres: Jupiter and Thetis

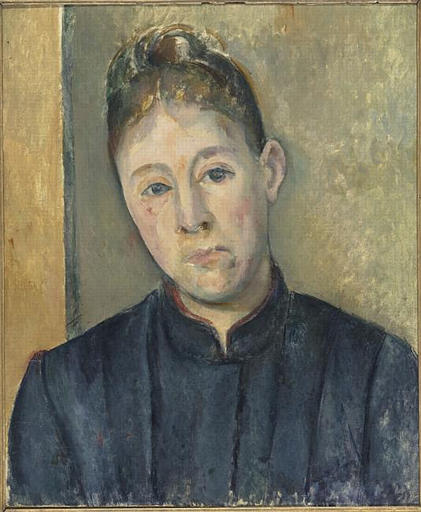
Paul Cézanne: portrait of Marie-Hortense Fiquet, the artist's wife, 1885-1887

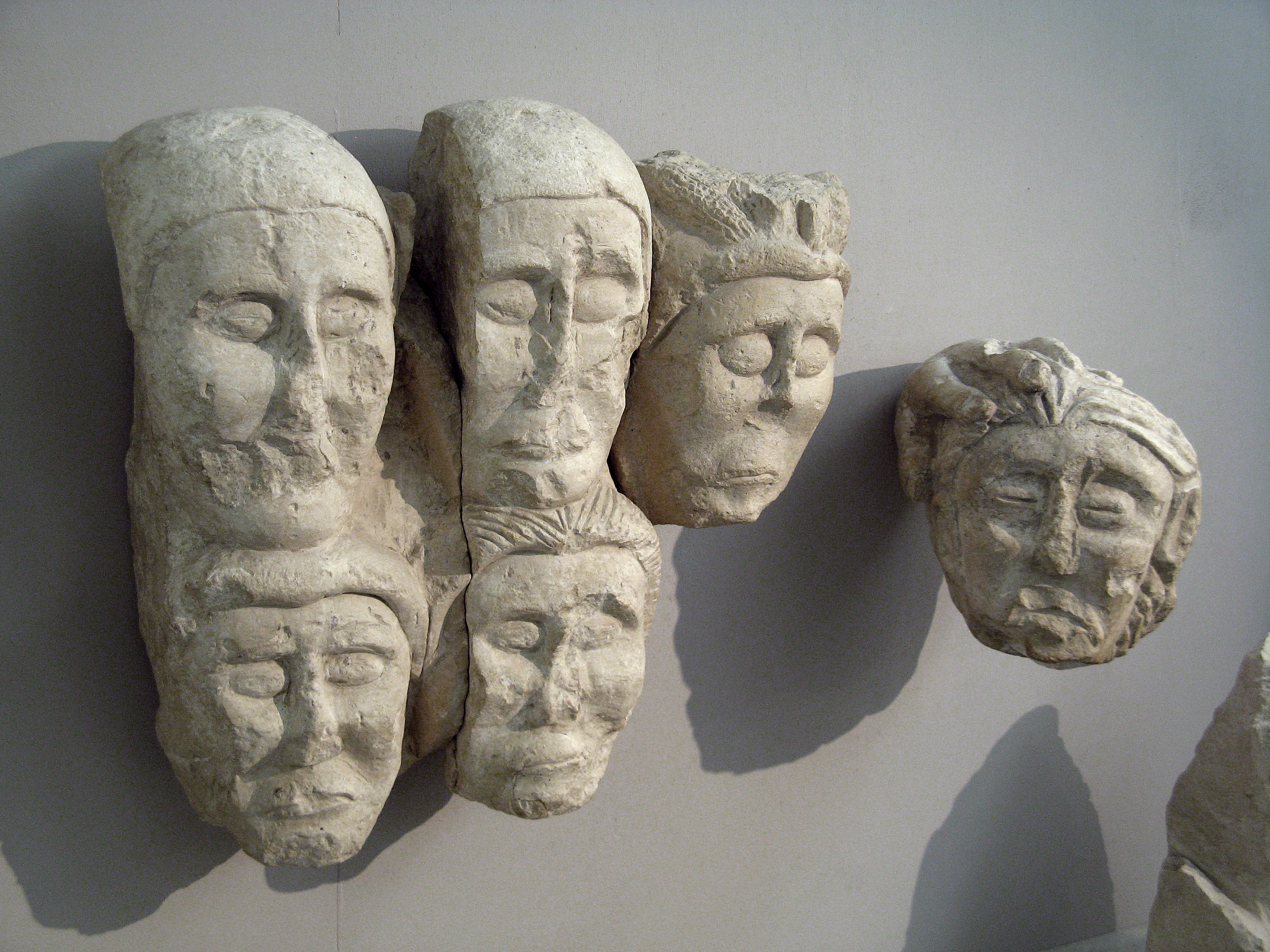
Sculptures of severed heads from the pre-Roman Celto-Ligurian settlement of Entremont, north of Aix

Nineteenth century busts in the sculpture gallery

== Planque collection ==
In June 2011, the first part of the collection of the Fondation Jean et Suzanne Planque opened at the Musée Granet, containing over 180 artworks. This legacy of the Swiss painter, dealer and art collector Jean Planque, a personal friend of Pablo Picasso, has been donated to the city for an initial period of 15 years. The collection contains over 300 works of art, including paintings and drawings by Degas, Renoir. Gauguin, Monet, Cézanne, Van Gogh, Picasso, Pierre Bonnard, Paul Klee, Fernand Léger, Giacometti and Dubuffet. The full collection was housed in a specially constructed annex in the Chapelle des Pénitents Blancs, situated nearby: the expected opening happened in 2013.
