= Cours Mirabeau =

Thoroughfare in Aix-en-Provence, France

Coordinates: 43°31′36″N 5°26′55″E

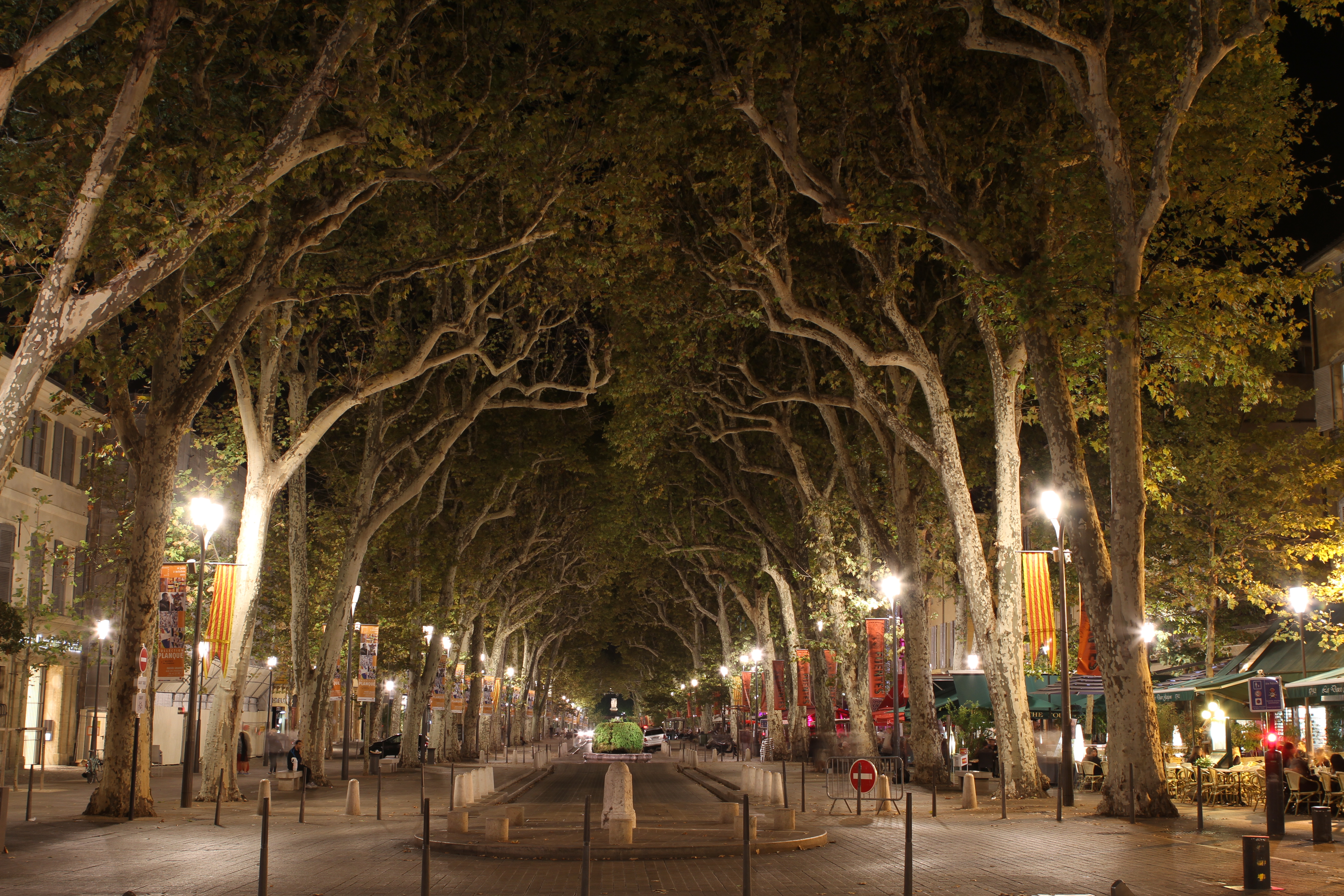
The Cours Mirabeau in Aix-en-Provence at night

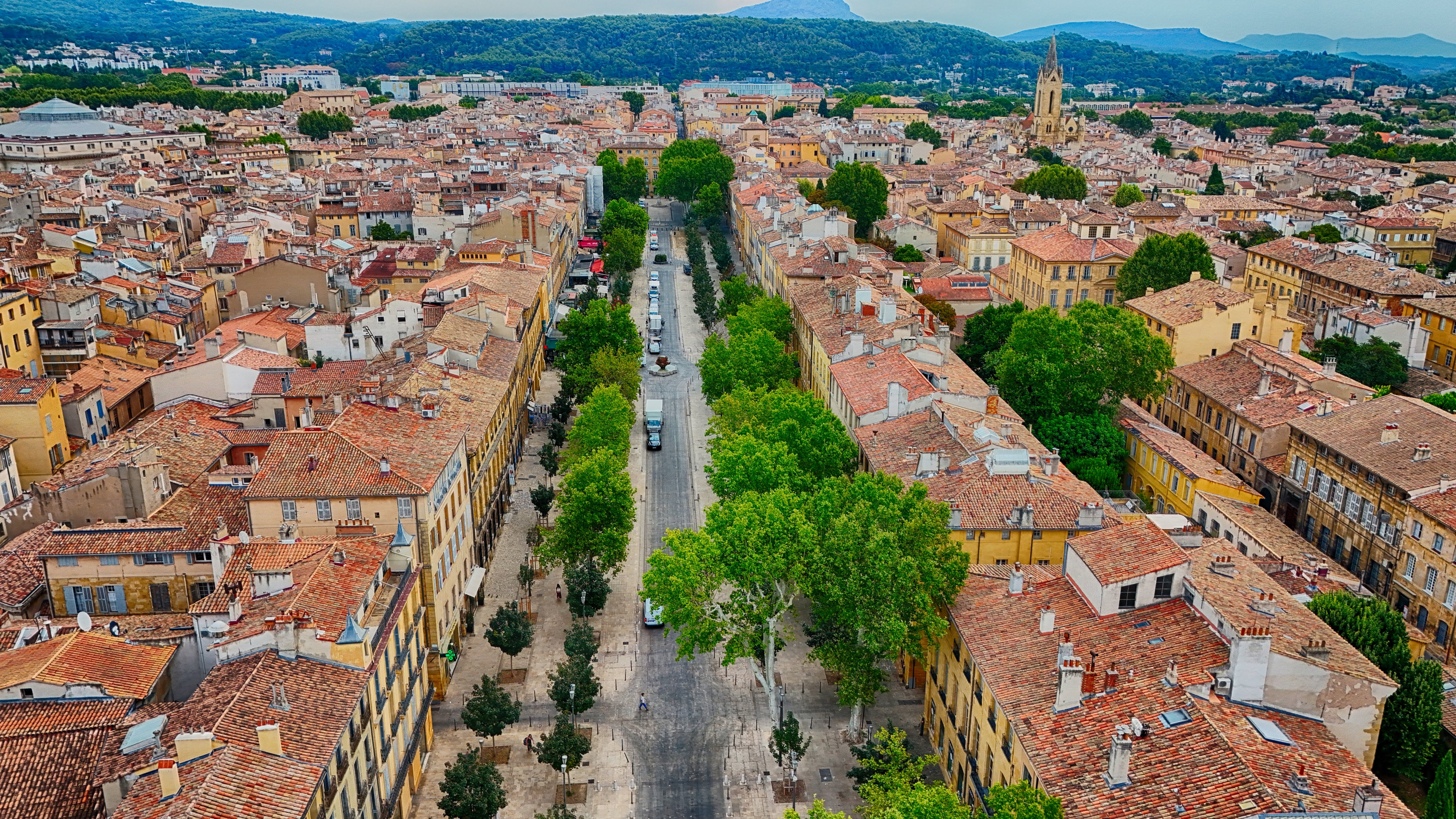
Aerial view of the main boulevard of Aix-en-Provence

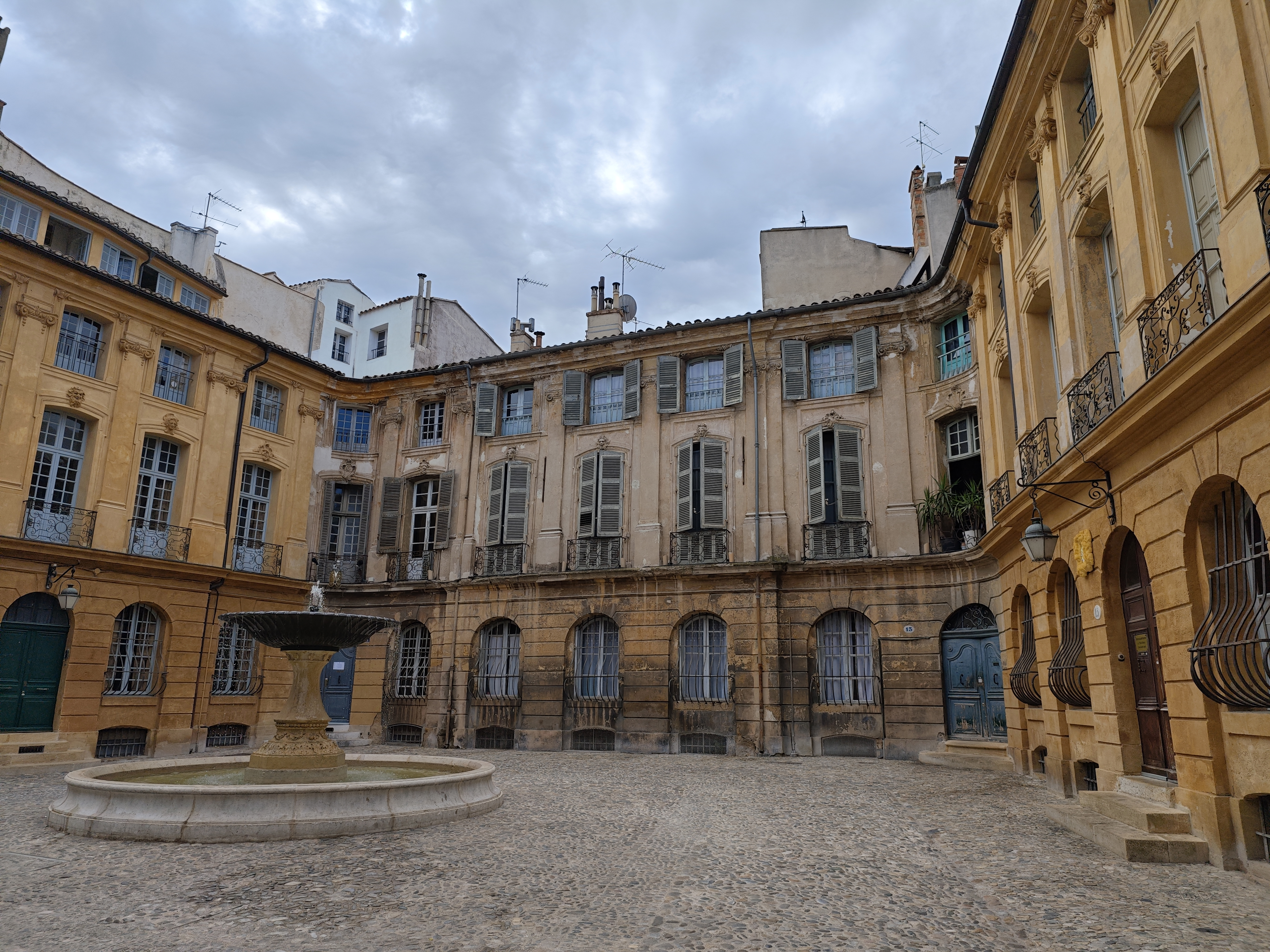
Cobbled square with shuttered historic façades and a central fountain in the old town of Aix-en-Provence.

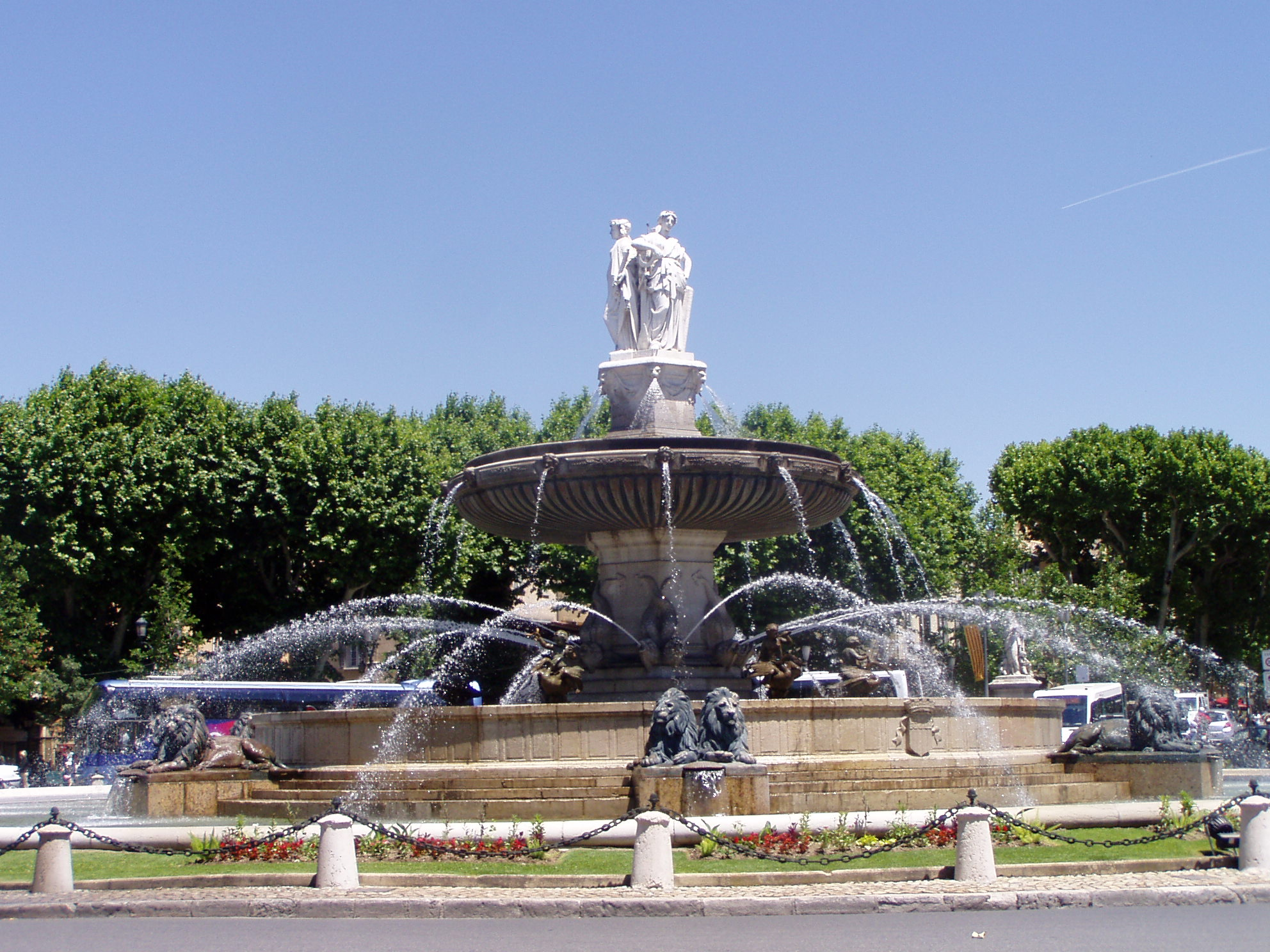
La Rotonde on Cours Mirabeau

The Cours Mirabeau is an avenue which is the main boulevard of Aix-en-Provence, France. The street is now closed to through traffic, improving pedestrian access to the space.

== Overview ==
440 meters long and 42 meters wide, the Cours Mirabeau is one of the most popular and lively places in the town. It is lined with many cafés, one of the most famous being Les Deux Garçons and during its history frequented by famous French cultural figures such as Paul Cézanne, Émile Zola and Albert Camus.

The street has wide sidewalks planted with double rows of plane-trees. The Cours Mirabeau is decorated by fountains, the most notable of which is the Fontaine de la Rotonde, a large fountain that makes up a roundabout at one end of the street. The street also divides Aix into two portions, the Quartier Mazarin, or "new town", which extends to the south and west, and the Ville Comtale, or "old town", which lies to the north with its wide but irregular streets and its old mansions dating from the 16th, 17th and 18th centuries.

== History ==
From 1646 onwards, rich locals started moving into the Mazarin quarter, built by Michele Mazzarino (1605 - 1648), known as "Michel Mazarin", the Dominican who was appointed Archbishop of Aix-en-Provence in 1645 by Pope Innocent X. Mazzarino had been professor of theology at the College of Saint Thomas, the future Pontifical University of Saint Thomas Aquinas, Angelicum in Rome, and Master of the Sacred Palace under Pope Urban VIII in 1642. Mazzarino was also the brother of Giulio Mazzarino, known as "Jules Mazarin" who served as chief minister under Louis XIV.

In 1650, the Parlement of Aix-en-Provence commissioned the building of a thoroughfare for carts where there was a crumbled rampart.

By 1696 four fountains had been built : Fontaine des 9 canons, Fontaine "Moussue, Fontaine du Roi René and, to the west, "les Chevaux-Marins", now vanished.

Whilst he first thought of building a palace there, the Duke of Vendôme came around and decided on the 'wildness of fields'. Instead he commissioned the Pavillon Vendôme, where he died in 1669.
