= Rotonde =

Rotonde may refer to:

== Locations ==
- Café de la Rotonde, a cafe in Paris, France.
- Fontaine de la Rotonde, a fountain in Aix-en-Provence, France.
- Simiane-la-Rotonde, a town in France.

== Newspaper ==
- La Rotonde, a student newspaper at the University of Ottawa in Canada.
