= Louis-Félix Chabaud =

French sculptor

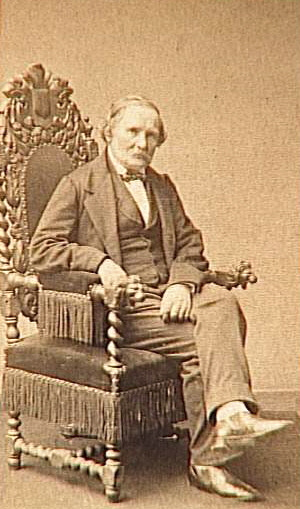
- Photograph of Louis-Félix Chabaud taken by Pierre Petit.
- Born: March 14, 1824; Venelles, Bouches-du-Rhône, Provence-Alpes-Côte d'Azur, France
- Died: April 25, 1902 (aged 78); Venelles, Bouches-du-Rhône, Provence-Alpes-Côte d'Azur, France
- Occupations: Sculptor, engraver, medallist

Louis-Félix Chabaud (1824–1902) was a French sculptor, engraver and medallist.

== Early life ==
Louis-Félix Chabaud was born on March 14, 1824, in Venelles, in the South of France.

== Career ==
He designed many sculptures at the Palais Garnier in Paris. He won the Prix de Rome for engraving in 1848.

He designed the Saint Louis fountain in Aix-en-Provence. In 1860, he also designed one of the sculptures at the top of the Fontaine de la Rotonde in Aix.

He served as the mayor of his hometown of Venelles from 1865 to 1870.

== Death ==
He died on April 25, 1902, in Venelles.

== Bibliography ==
- Jean-Marc Héry, Louis-Félix Chabaud: paradoxes d'un sculpteur oublié, Paris: Editions Mare & Martin, 2011.
