= Fontaine de la Rotonde =

Fountain in France

Coordinates: 43.5263°N 5.4454°E

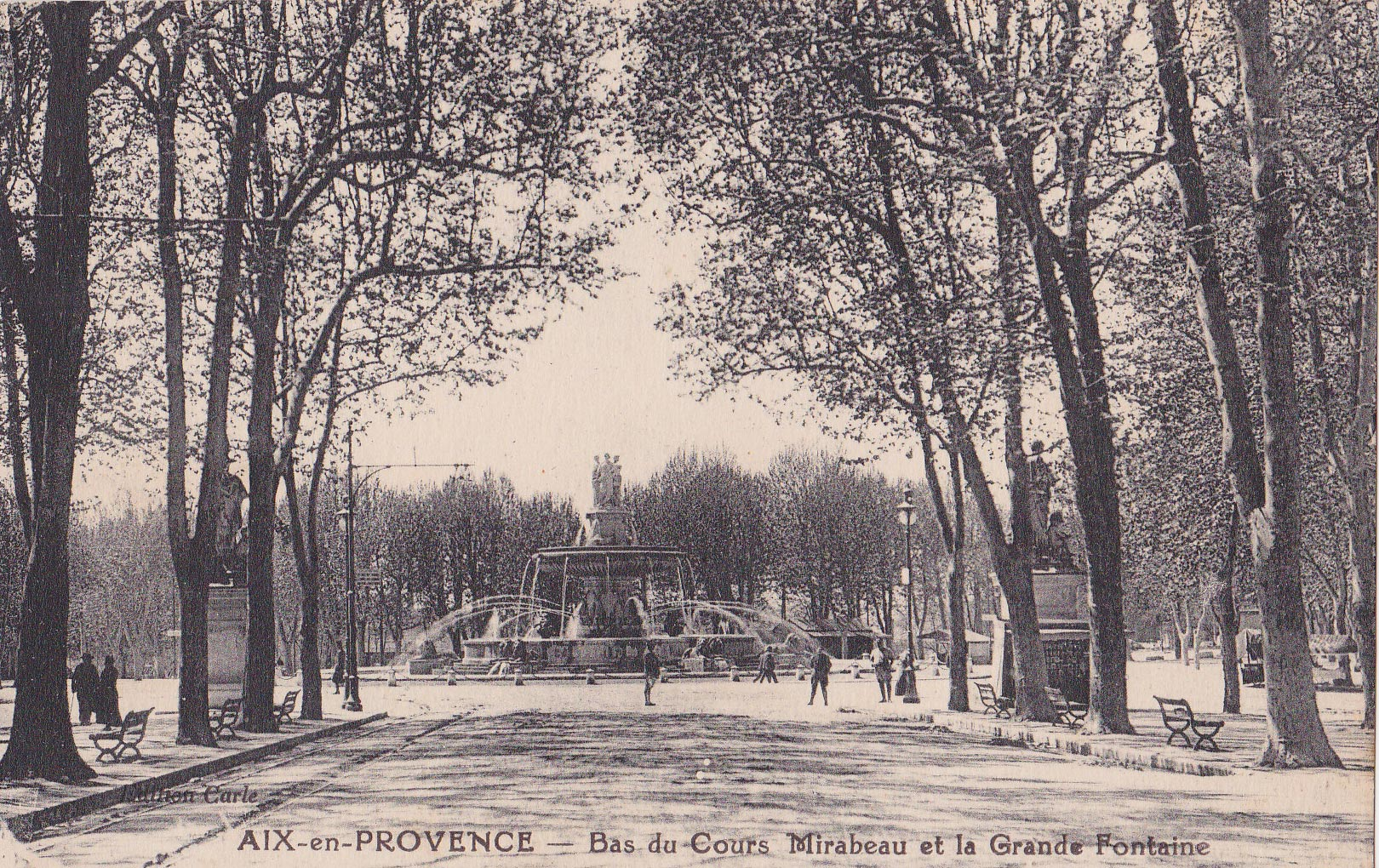
Fontaine de la Rotonde in 1910.

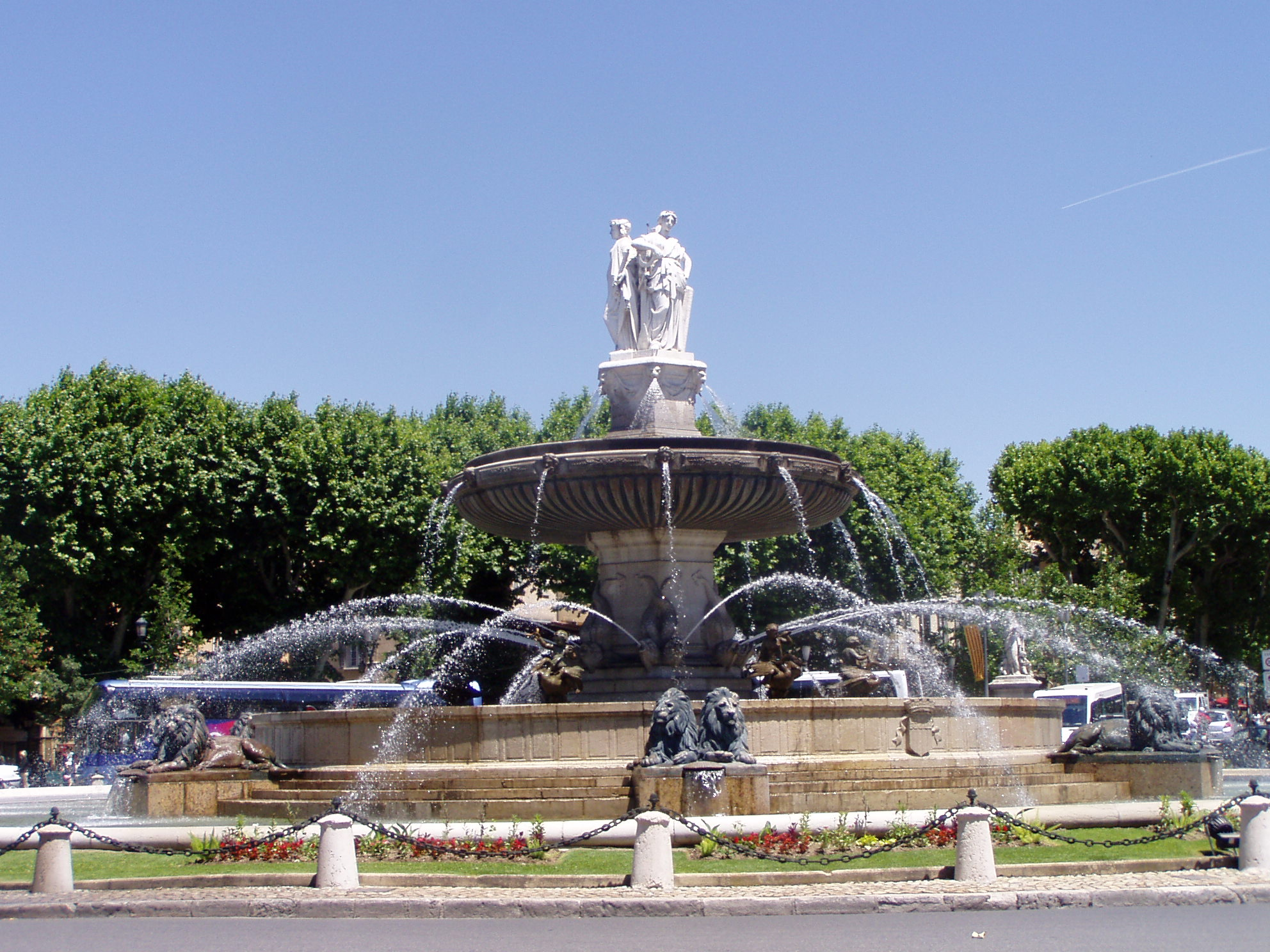
Fontaine de la Rotonde in 2008.

The Fontaine de la Rotonde is a historic fountain in Aix-en-Provence, Bouches-du-Rhône, France.

== Location ==
It is located on the Place de la Rotonde, at the bottom of the Cours Mirabeau in the centre of Aix-en-Provence.

== History ==
The Place de la Rotonde was built from 1840 to 1850. Ten years later, in 1860, Théophile de Tournadre designed this fountain.

It is 32 metre wide and 12 metre high. It is surrounded by bronze sculptures of twelve lions, sirens and angels on the backs of swans. At the top of the fountain are three sculptures of female figures presenting Justice (towards the Cours Mirabeau), Agriculture (towards Marseille) and the Fine Arts (towards Avignon). They were sculpted by Joseph-Marius Ramus (1805-1888), Hippolyte Ferrat (1822-1882) and Louis-Félix Chabaud (1824-1902).

The water first came from the Zola Canal built in 1854. In 1875, it came from the Verdon Canal. It now comes from the Canal de Provence.

== Gallery ==
Fontaine de la Rotonde
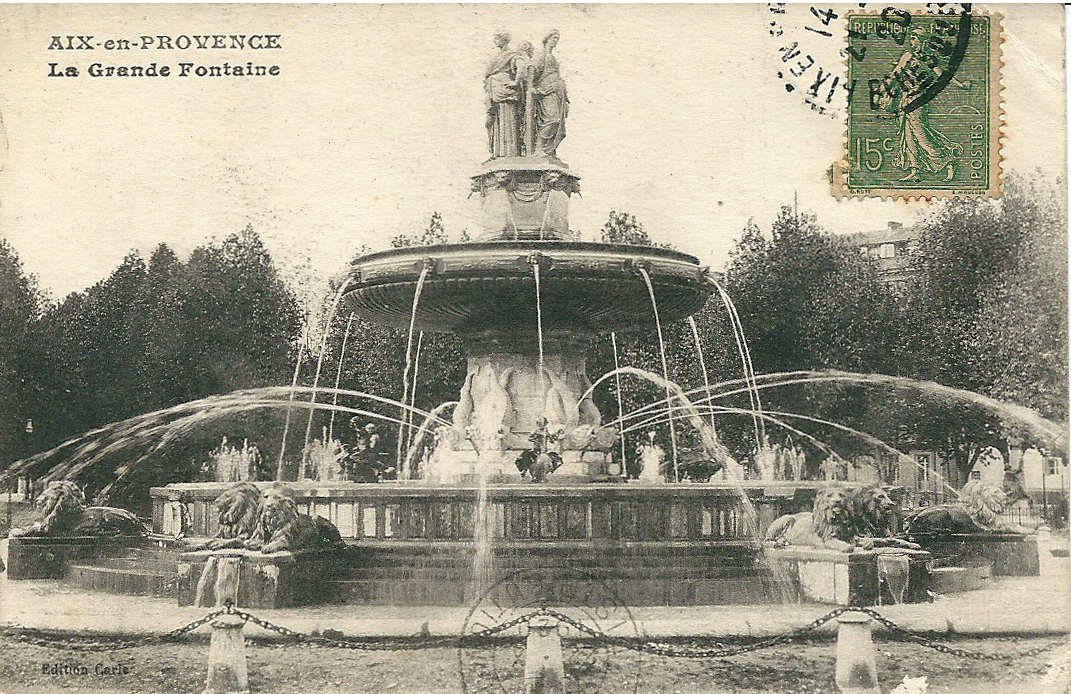
Old postcard

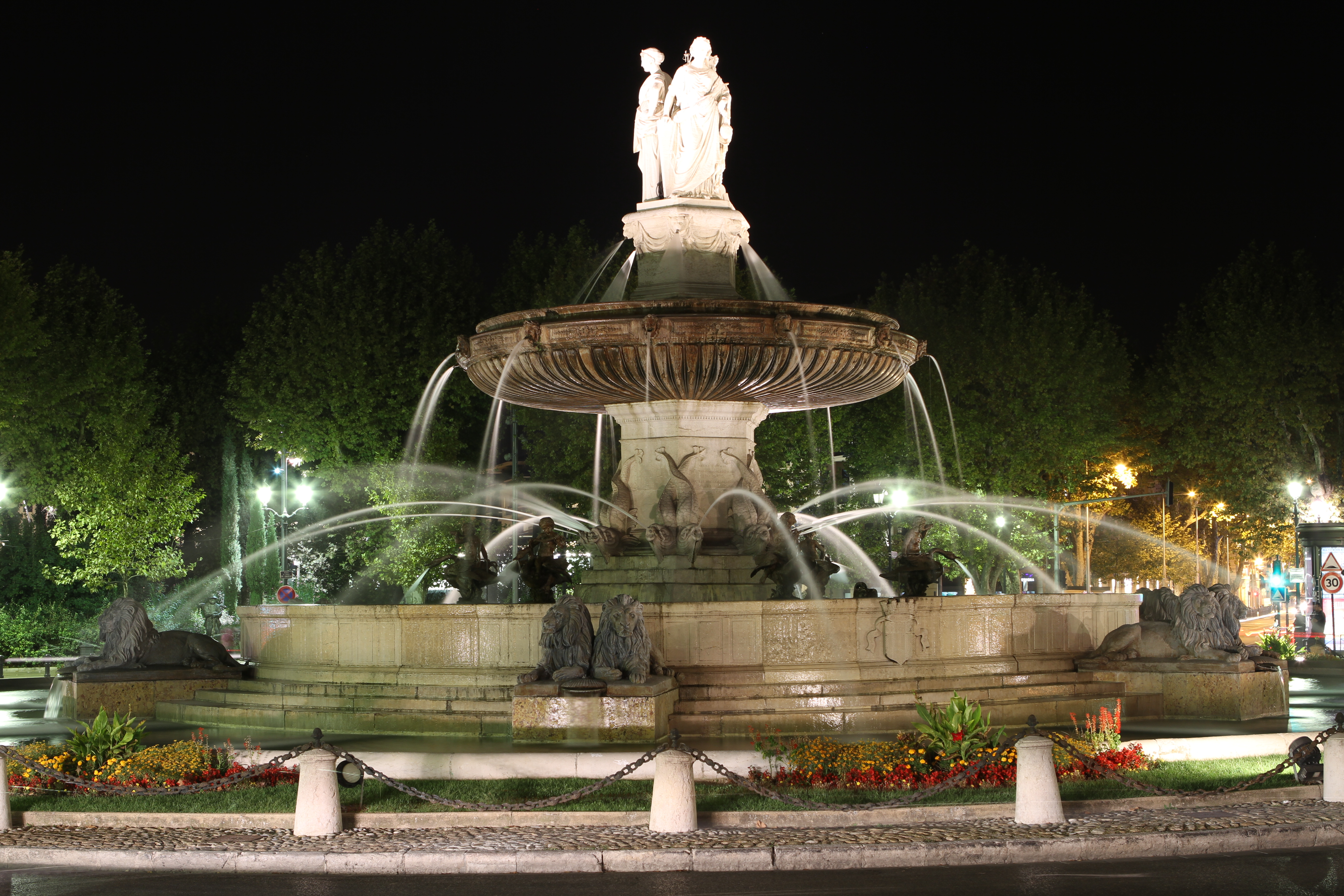
At night

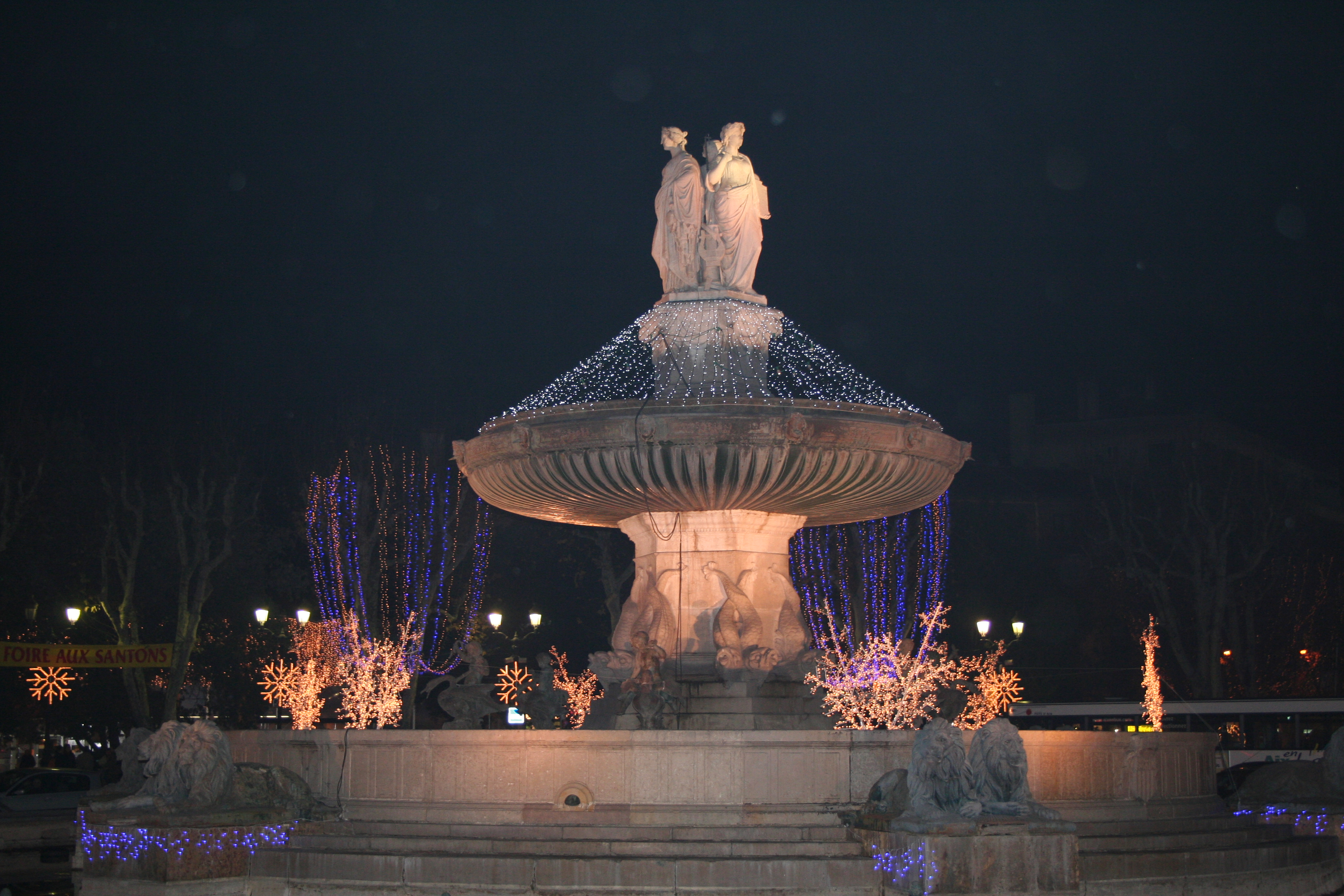
At night, with Christmas lights

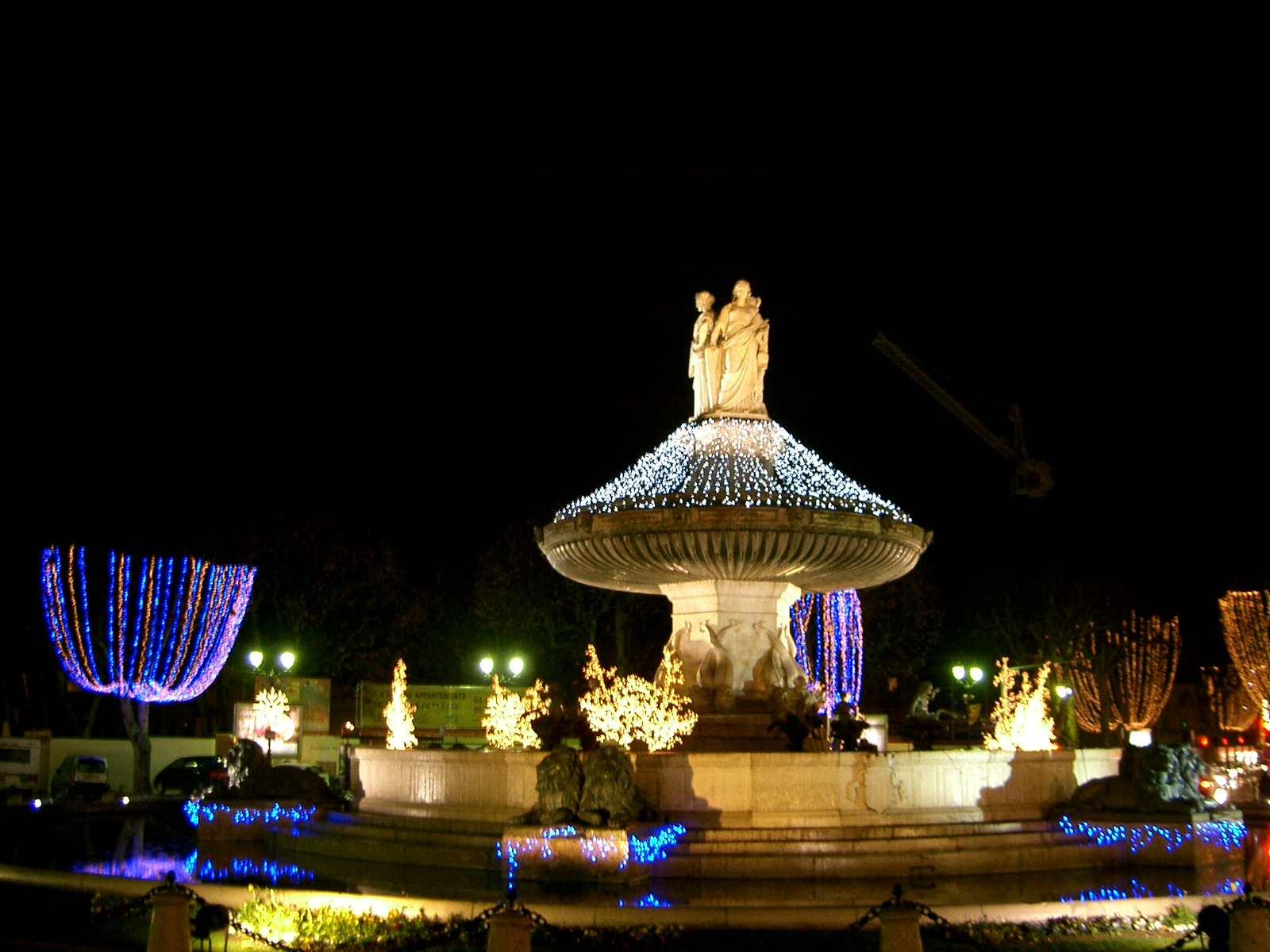
At night, with Christmas lights

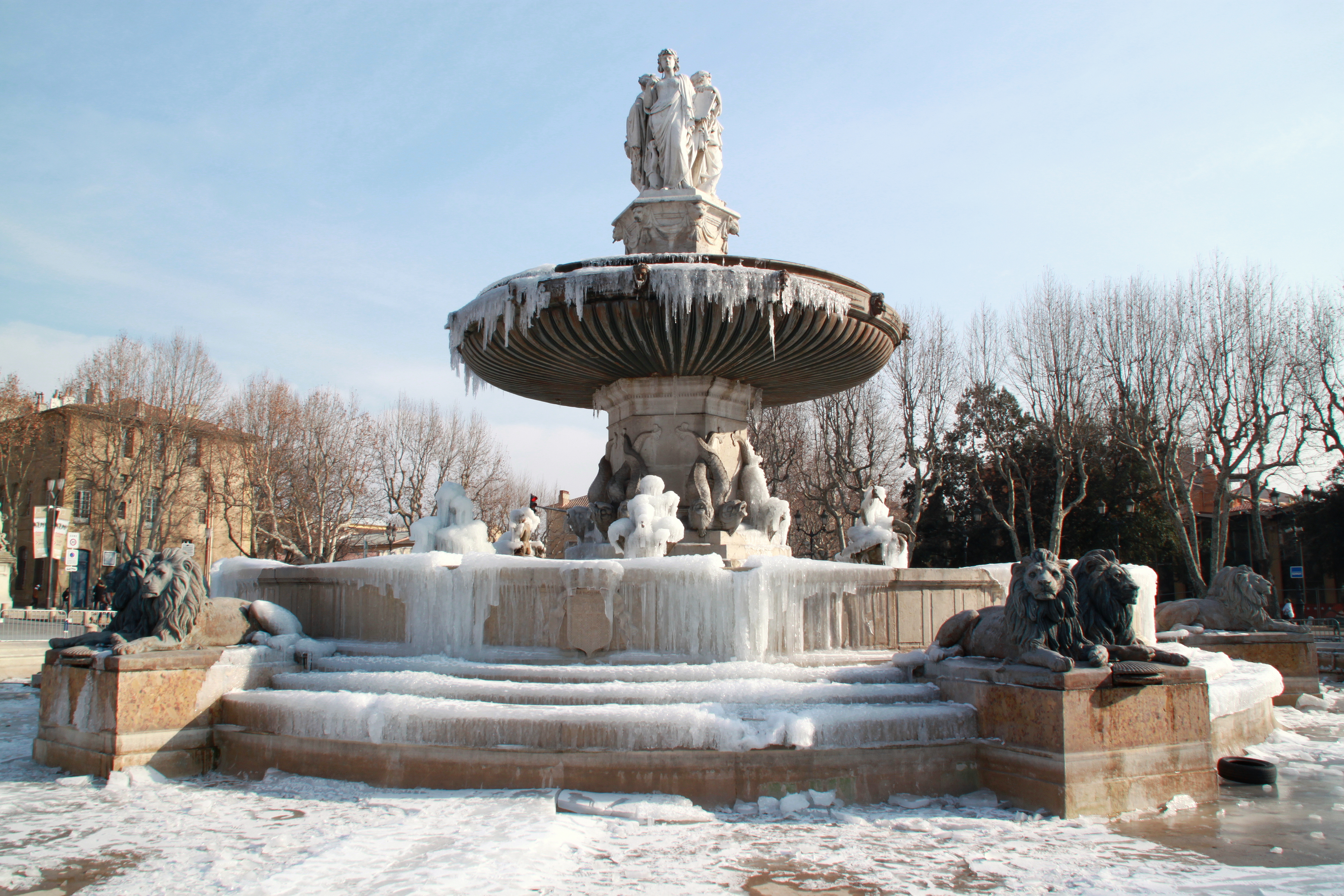
Covered in ice during winter

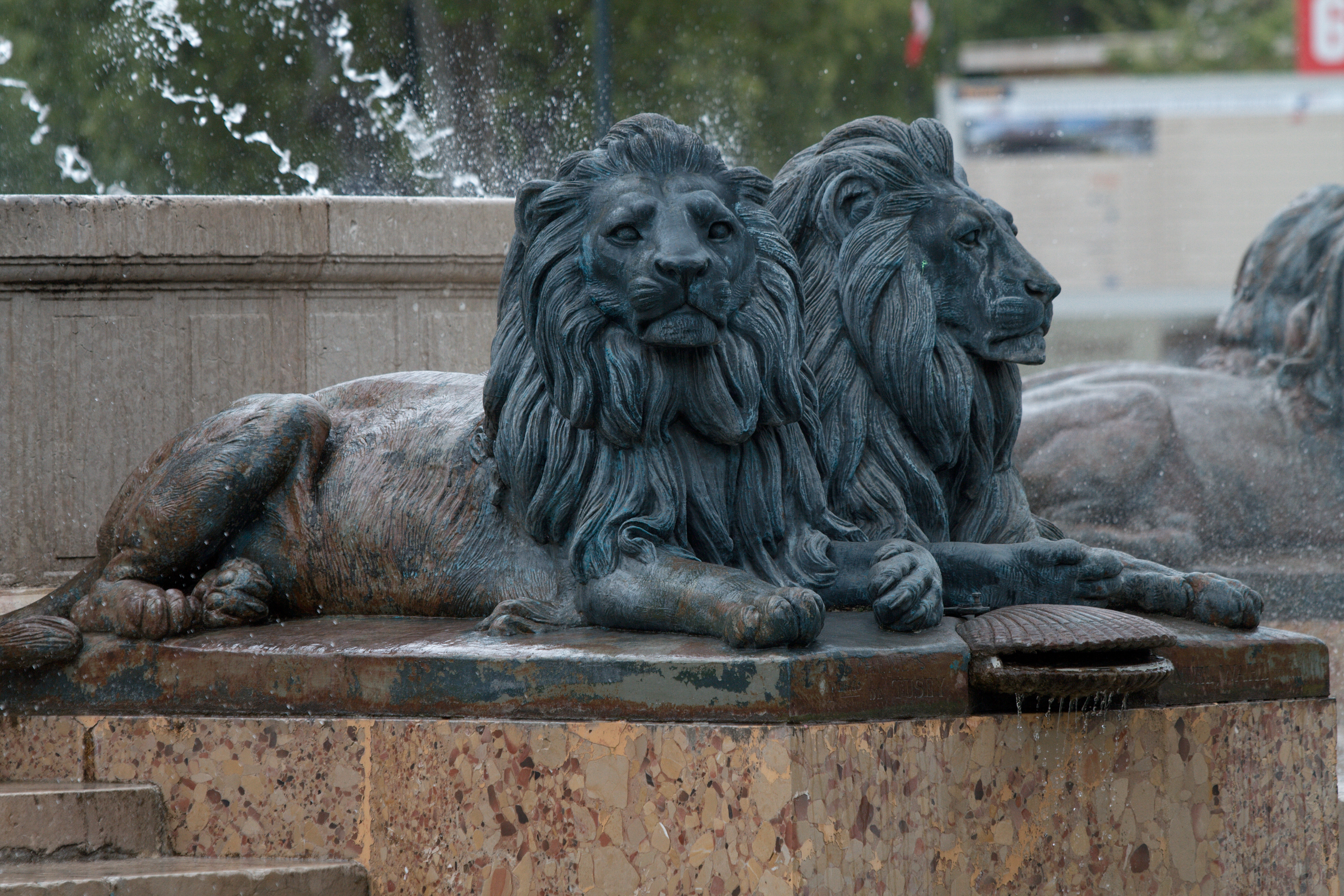
Sculpture of lions

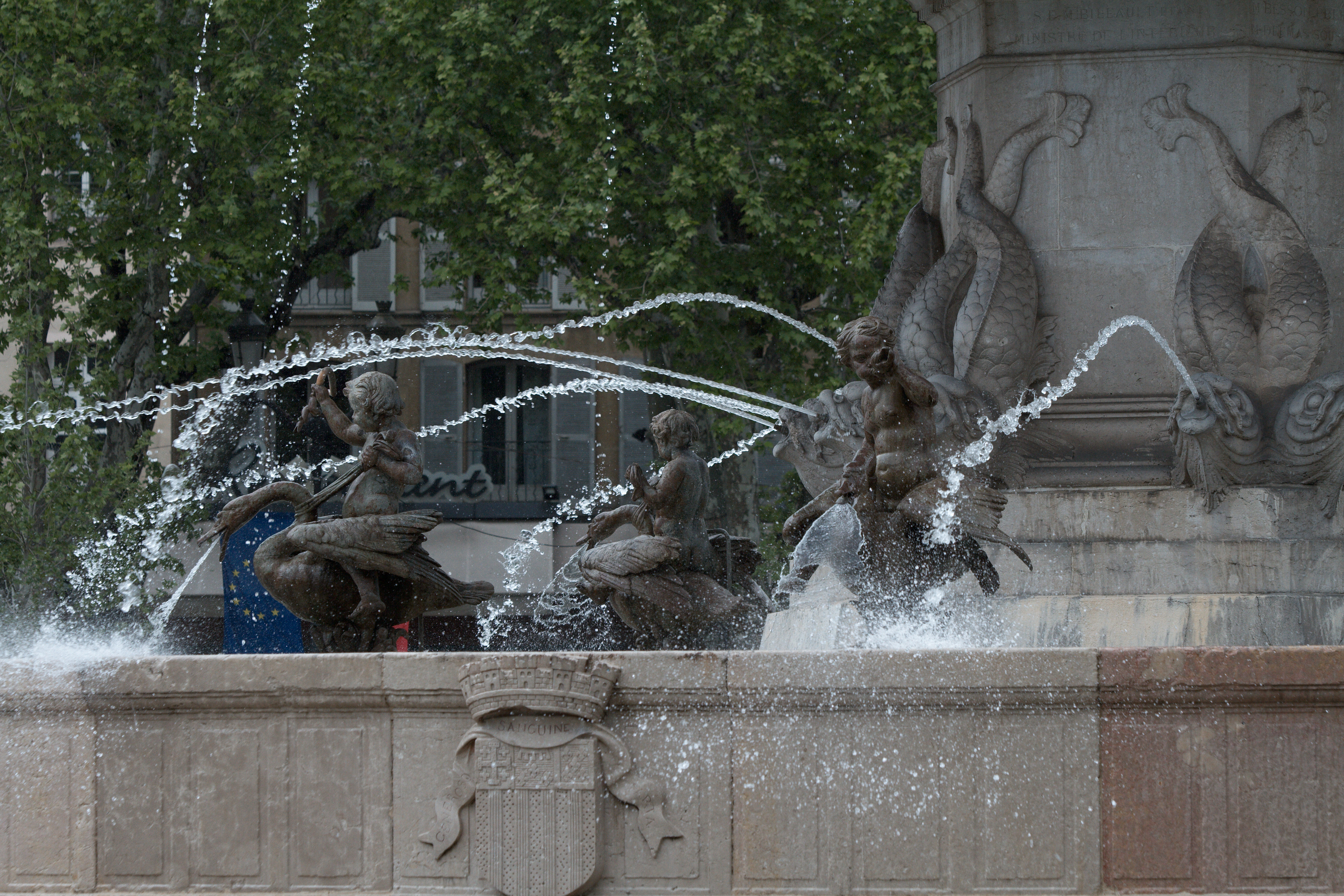
Sculpture of angels and dolphins

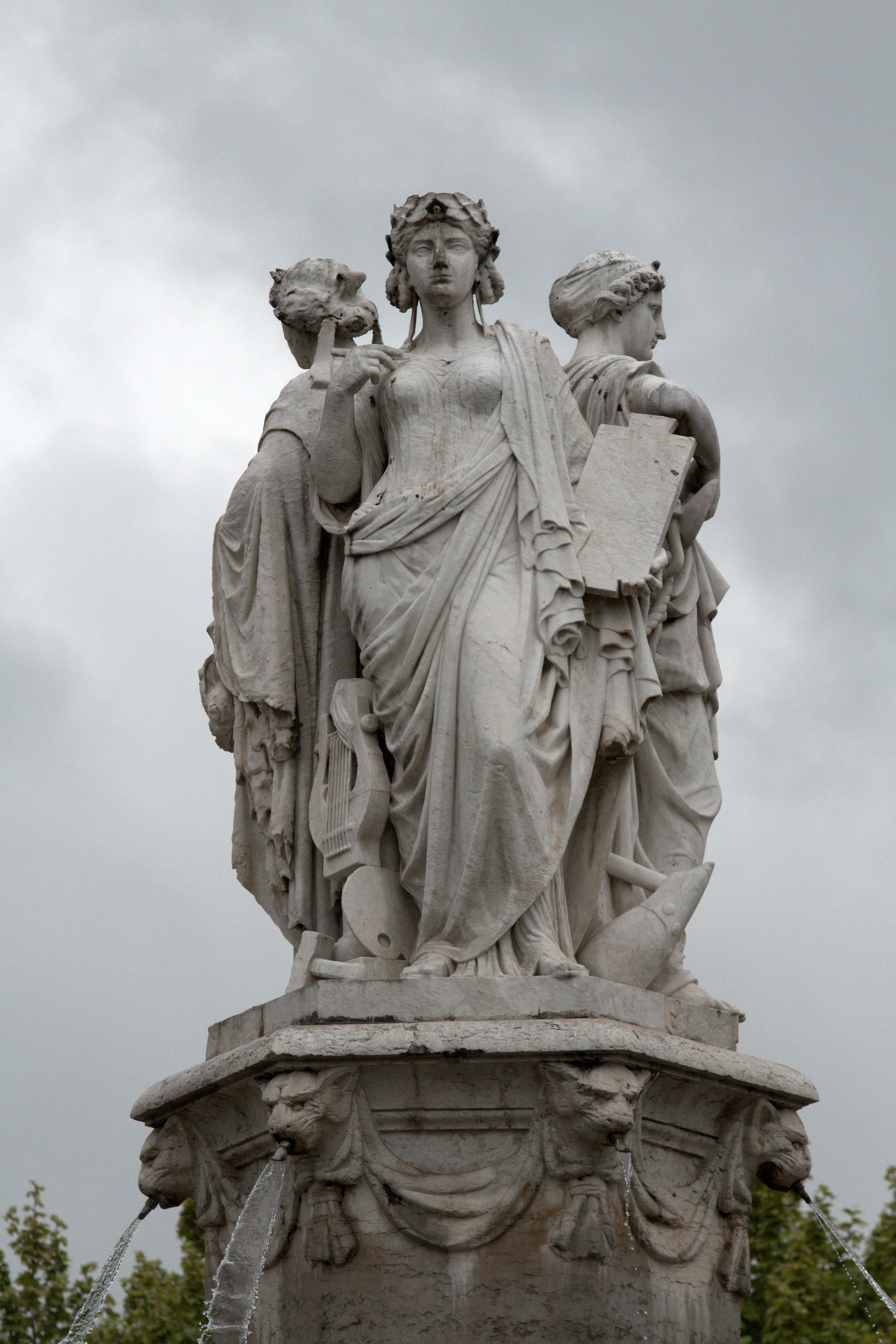
Sculpture at the top

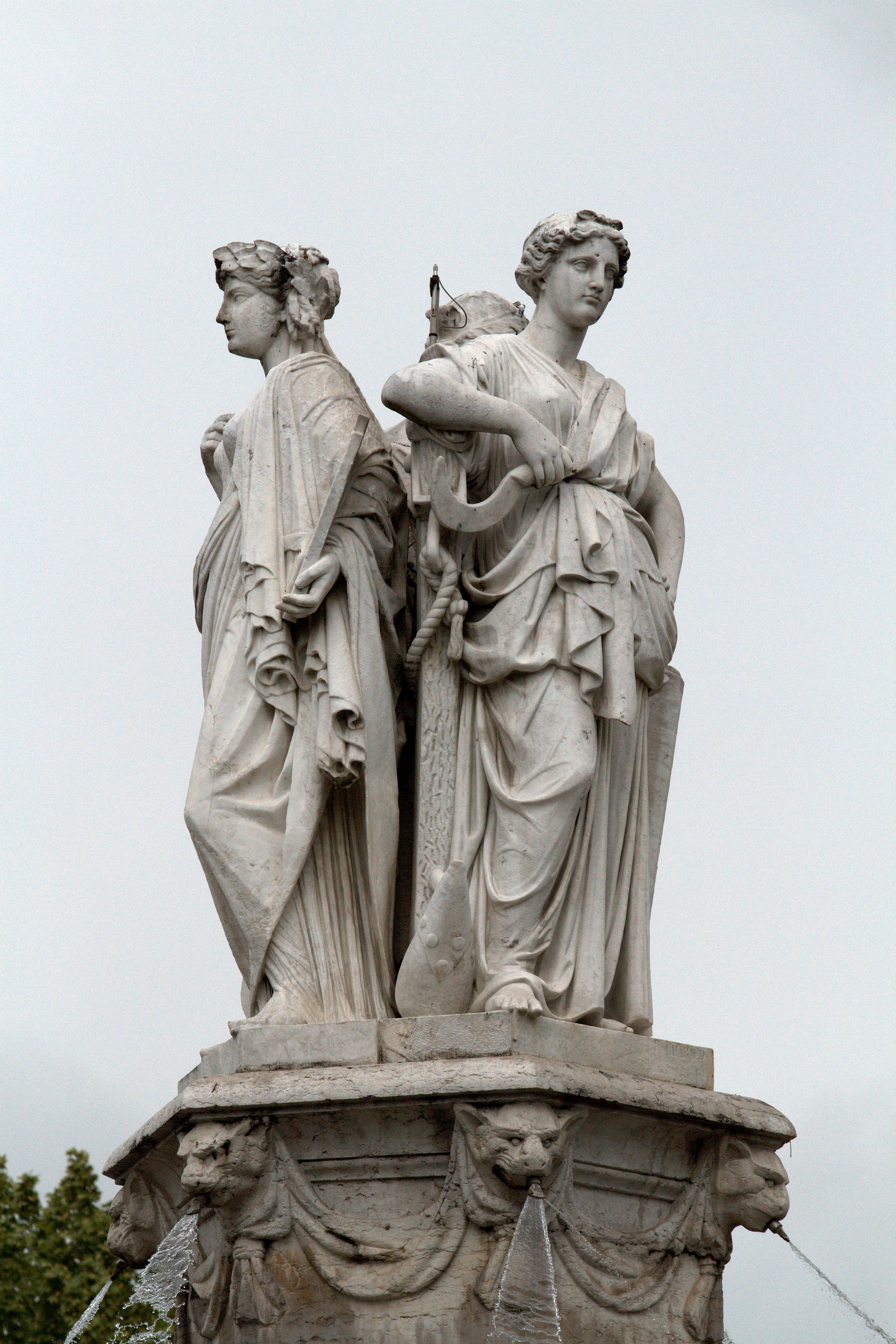
Sculpture at the top

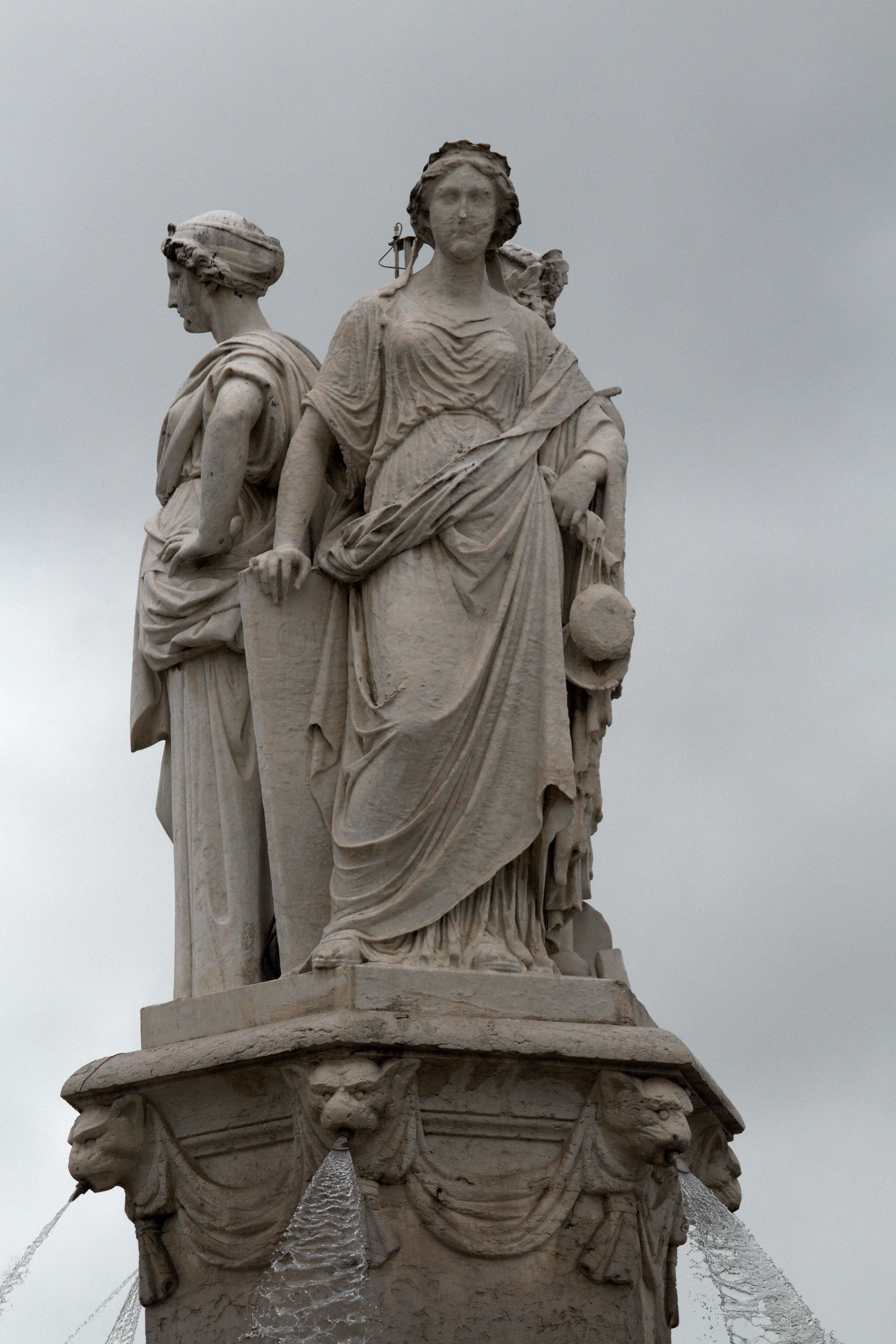
Sculpture at the top
