= Marc Béziat =

- Born: 12 September 1975 (age 49); Aix-en-Provence, Bouches-du-Rhône, France
- Genres: Classical music, Electronic music
- Occupation: Composer
- Instrument: Keyboards
- Years active: 2004-present
- Website: http://marcbeziat.net

Marc Béziat (born September 12, 1975 in Aix-en-Provence, France), is a music composer.

Béziat has always been a music enthusiast, he began his career as a composer at the age of 28. To assess the competences which he has acquired as a self-educated person, he begins in 2005 an education in musical writing and composition in the "Polyphonies organization". Thus, with a wealth of his new experience, he launched himself in 2007 as composer of his first album Victory of the Spirit which is followed in 2009 by a second: Consolation as well as two singles: "The Star of Peace" and "Gloria", respectively in 2009 and 2010. Although he is a young composer, Marc Béziat has received many eulogistic comments from professionals who distributed his music.

== Award ==
One of the compositions of Marc Béziat, "The Free Movement", has won the "Song of the Year" competition in the category Instrumental / Jazz / World.

== Broadcast ==
Since 2008, the music of Marc Béziat is distributed on the air and the Web. (Francophonie diffusion, Jango, Live 365 Network)
It is also available on one of the principal legal download platform.

== Discography ==
=== Albums ===
- Victory of the Spirit (2008)
- Consolation (2009)

=== Singles ===
- The Star of Peace (2009)
- Gloria (2010)
