= Ionic order =

Order of classical architecture

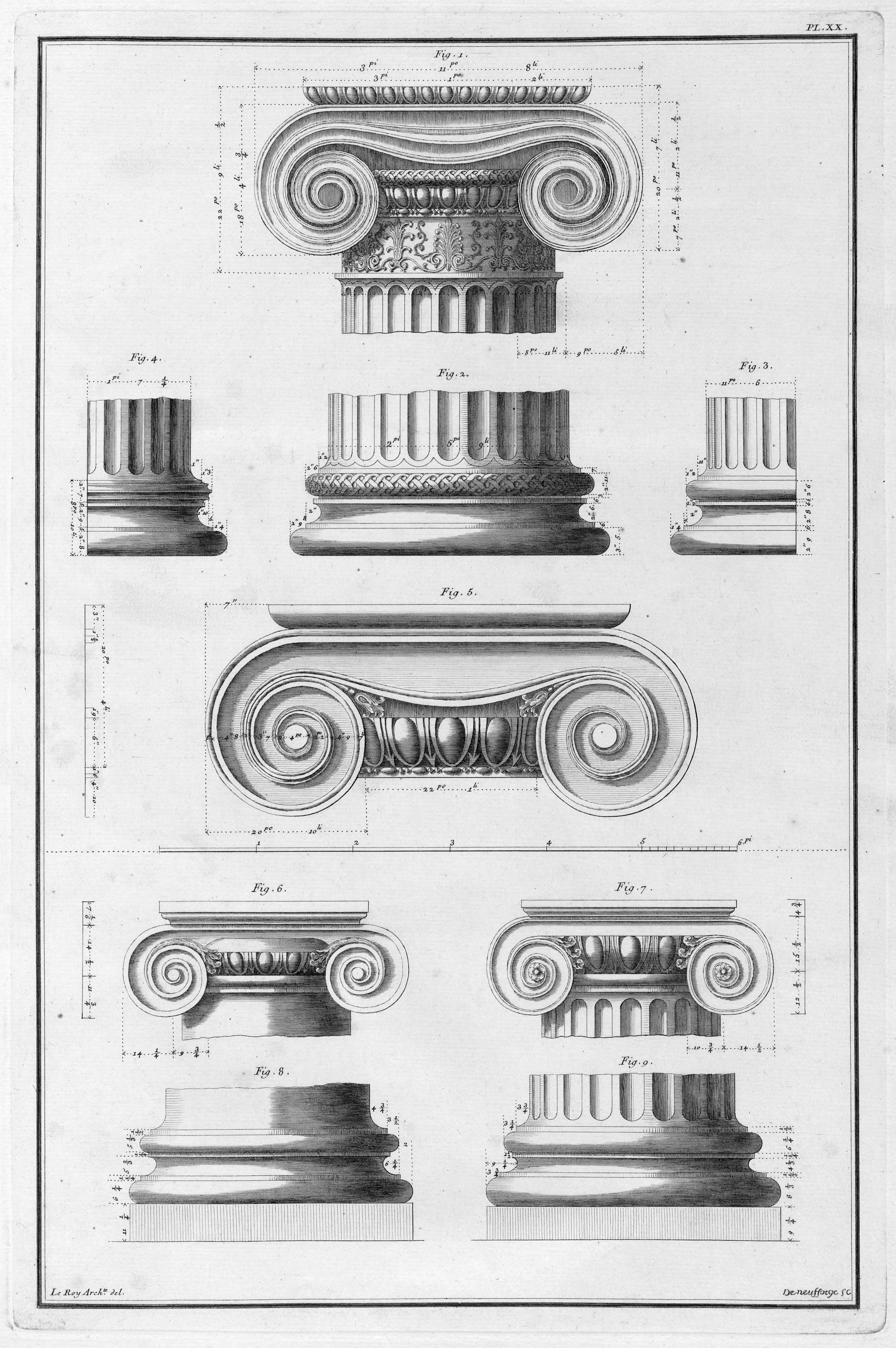
Architects' first real look at the Greek Ionic order: Julien David LeRoy, Les ruines plus beaux des monuments de la Grèce, Paris, 1758 (Plate XX)

The Ionic order (Latin: Ordo Ionicus) is one of the three canonic orders of classical architecture, the other two being the Doric and the Corinthian. There are two other orders, developed by the Romans: the Tuscan (a plainer Doric), and the rich variant of Corinthian called the Composite order. Of the three classical canonic orders, the Corinthian order has the narrowest columns, followed by the Ionic order, with the Doric order having the widest columns.

The Ionic capital is characterized by the use of volutes. Ionic columns normally stand on a base which separates the shaft of the column from the stylobate or platform while the cap is usually enriched with egg-and-dart.

The ancient architect and architectural historian Vitruvius associates the Ionic with feminine proportions (and the Doric with masculine ones).

== Description ==
Ionic order: 1 – entablature, 2 – column, 3 – pediment, 4 – frieze, 5 – architrave or epistyle, 6 – capital (composed of abacus and volutes), 7 – shaft, 8 – base, 9 – stylobate, 10 – krepis

=== Capital ===
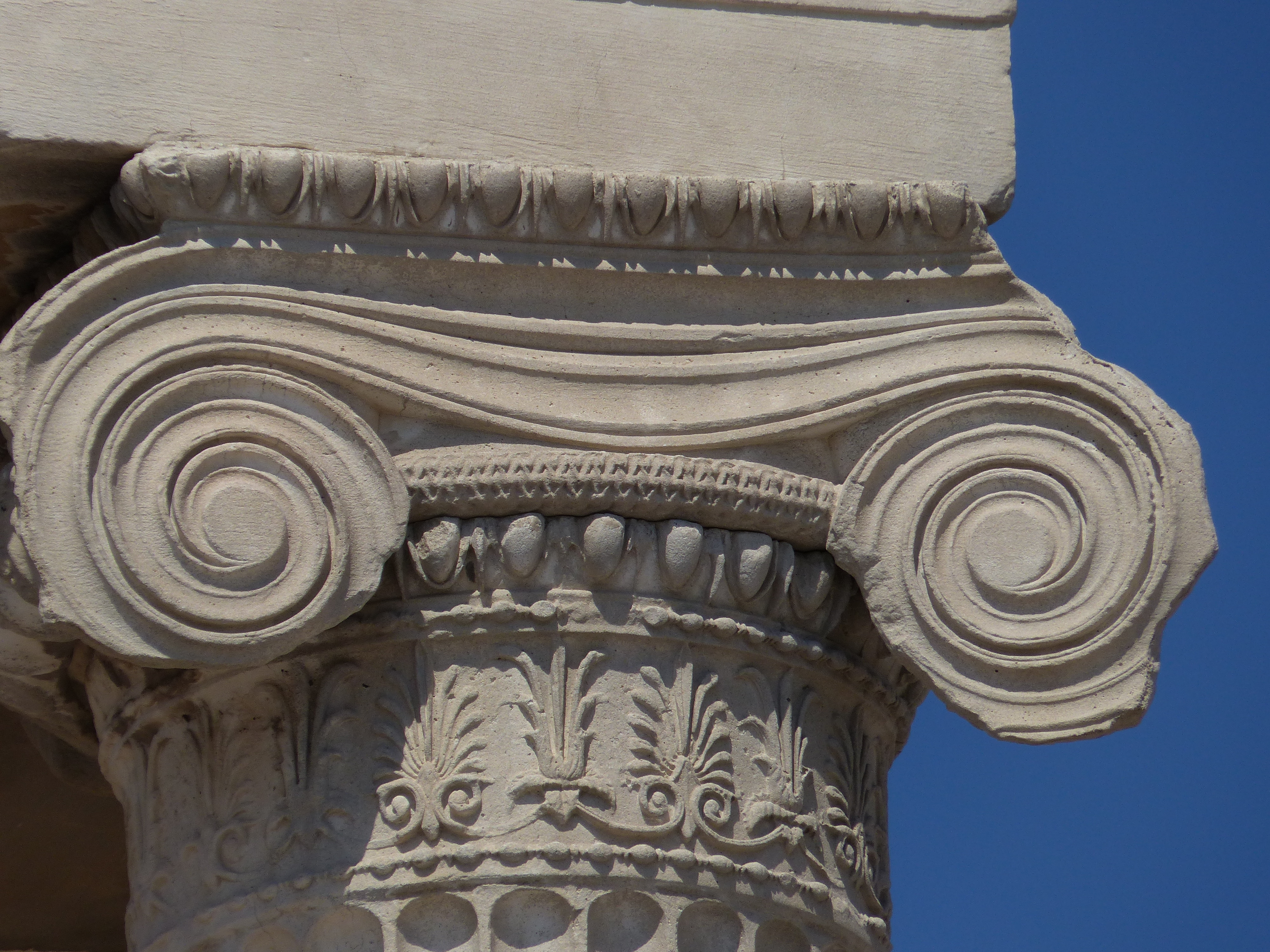
Ionic capital at the Erechtheum (Athens), 5th century BC

The major features of the Ionic order are the volutes of its capital, which have been the subject of much theoretical and practical discourse, based on a brief and obscure passage in Vitruvius. The only tools required to design these features were a straight-edge, a right angle, string (to establish half-lengths) and a compass. Below the volutes, the Ionic column may have a wide collar or banding separating the capital from the fluted shaft (as in, for example, the neoclassical mansion Castle Coole), or a swag of fruit and flowers may swing from the clefts or "neck" formed by the volutes.

Typically, the volutes lay in a single plane (illustration at right); then it was seen that they could be angled out on the corners. This feature of the Ionic order made it more pliant and satisfactory than the Doric to critical eyes in the 4th century BC: angling the volutes on the corner columns ensured that they "read" equally when seen from either front or side facade. However, some classical artists viewed this as unsatisfactory, feeling that the placement of Ionic columns at building corners required a distortion at the expense of the capital's structural logic; the Temple of Apollo at Bassae was built using a four-sided form of Ionic capital in its interior; the Temple of Saturn at Rome was built using the Ionic capital with diagonally carved volutes; the Corinthian order was also offered a solution by reading equally well from all angles. The 16th-century Renaissance architect and theorist Vincenzo Scamozzi designed a version of such a perfectly four-sided Ionic capital that it became standard; when a Greek Ionic order was eventually reintroduced in the later 18th century Greek Revival, it conveyed an air of archaic freshness and primitive, perhaps even republican, vitality.

=== Columns and entablature ===
The Ionic column is always more slender than the Doric; therefore, it always has a base: Ionic columns are eight and nine column-diameters tall, and even more in the Antebellum colonnades of late American Greek Revival plantation houses.

Ionic columns are most often fluted. After a little early experimentation, the number of hollow flutes in the shaft settled at 24. This standardization kept the fluting in a familiar proportion to the diameter of the column at any scale, even when the height of the column was exaggerated. Unlike Greek Doric fluting, which runs out to an arris or sharp edge, that was easily damaged by people brushing it as they passed by, Ionic fluting leaves a little flat-seeming surface of the column surface between each hollow (in fact it is a small segment of a circle around the column).

In some instances, the fluting has been omitted. English architect Inigo Jones introduced a note of sobriety with plain Ionic columns on his Banqueting House, Whitehall, London, and when Beaux-Arts architect John Russell Pope wanted to convey the manly stamina combined with intellect of Theodore Roosevelt, he left colossal Ionic columns unfluted on the Roosevelt memorial at the American Museum of Natural History, New York City, for an unusual impression of strength and stature. Wabash Railroad architect R.E. Mohr included eight unfluted Ionic frontal columns on his 1928 design for the railroad's Delmar Boulevard station in St. Louis.

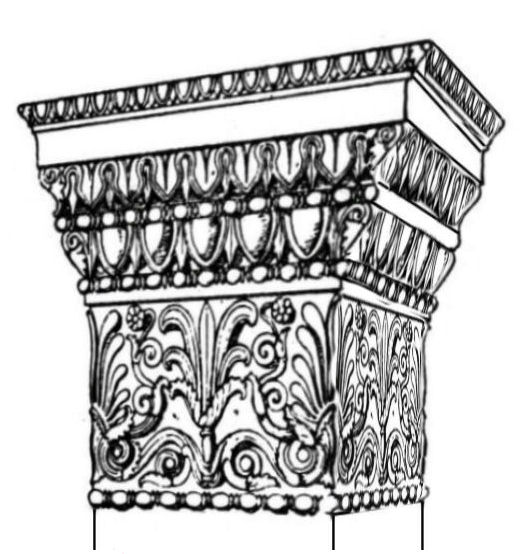
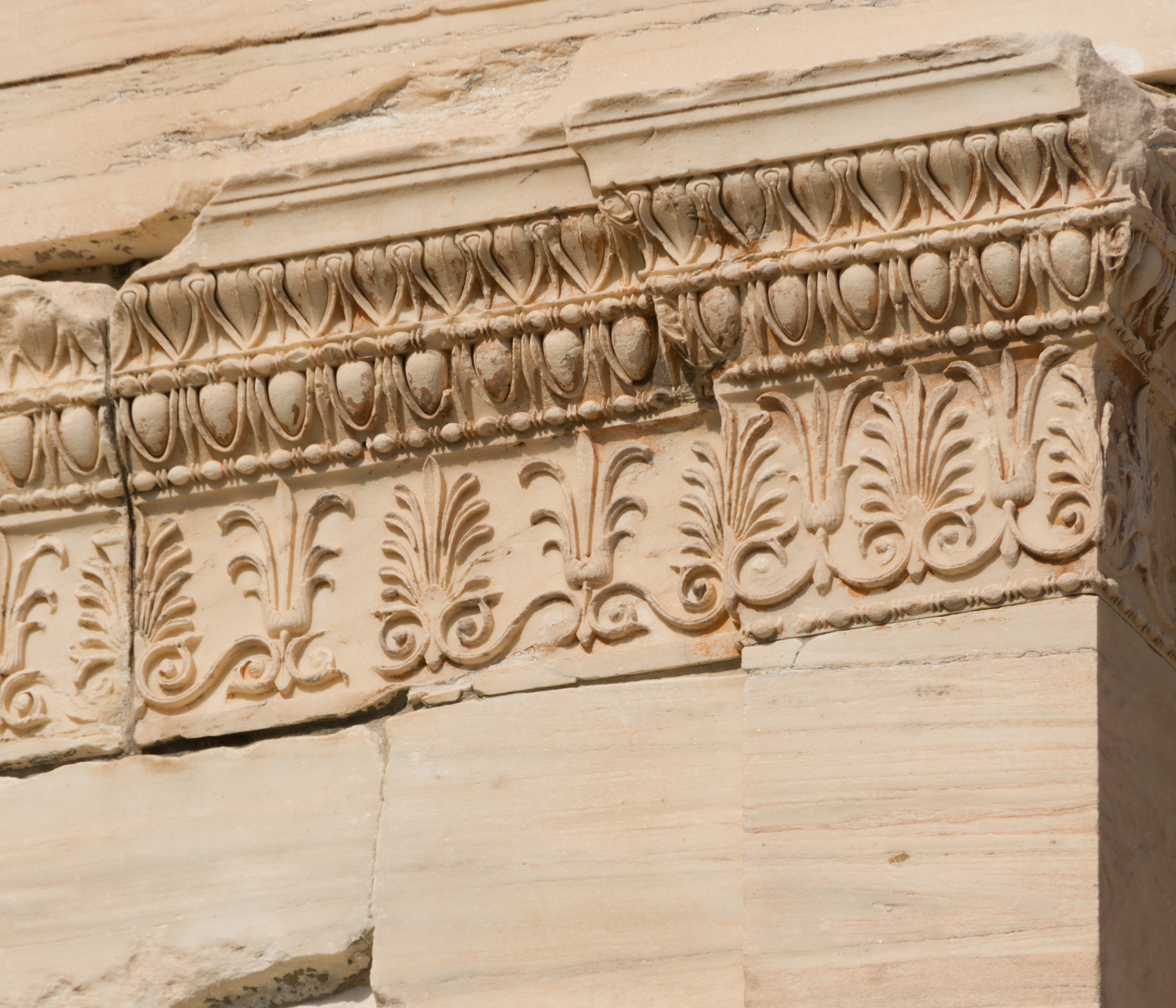
Left image: Characteristic design of the Ionic anta capital (essentially flat layout with straight horizontal moldings).
Right image: A Ionic anta capital, with extensive bands of floral patterns in prolongation of adjoining friezes at the Erechtheion (circa 410 BC).

The entablature resting on the columns has three parts: a plain architrave divided into two, or more generally three, bands, with a frieze resting on it that may be richly sculptural, and a cornice built up with dentils (like the closely spaced ends of joists), with a corona ("crown") and cyma ("ogee") molding to support the projecting roof. Pictorial, often narrative, bas-relief frieze carving provides a characteristic feature of the Ionic order, in the area where the Doric order is articulated with triglyphs. Roman and Renaissance practice condensed the height of the entablature by reducing the proportions of the architrave, which made the frieze more prominent.

=== Anta capital ===
The Ionic anta capital is the Ionic version of the anta capital, the crowning portion of an anta, which is the front edge of a supporting wall in Greek temple architecture. The anta is generally crowned by a stone block designed to spread the load from superstructure (entablature) it supports, called an "anta capital" when it is structural, or sometimes "pilaster capital" if it is only decorative as often during the Roman period.

In order not to protrude unduly from the wall, these anta capitals usually display a rather flat surface, so that the capital has more or less a rectangular-shaped structure overall. The Ionic anta capital, in contrast to the regular column capitals, is highly decorated and generally includes bands of alternating lotuses and flame palmettes, and bands of eggs and darts and beads and reels patterns, in order to maintain continuity with the decorative frieze lining the top of the walls. This difference with the column capitals disappeared with Roman times when anta or pilaster capitals have designs very similar to those of the column capitals. The Ionic anta capitals as can be seen in the Ionic order temple of the Erechtheion (circa 410 BCE), are characteristically rectangular Ionic anta capitals, with extensive bands of floral patterns in prolongation of adjoining friezes.

== History of use ==
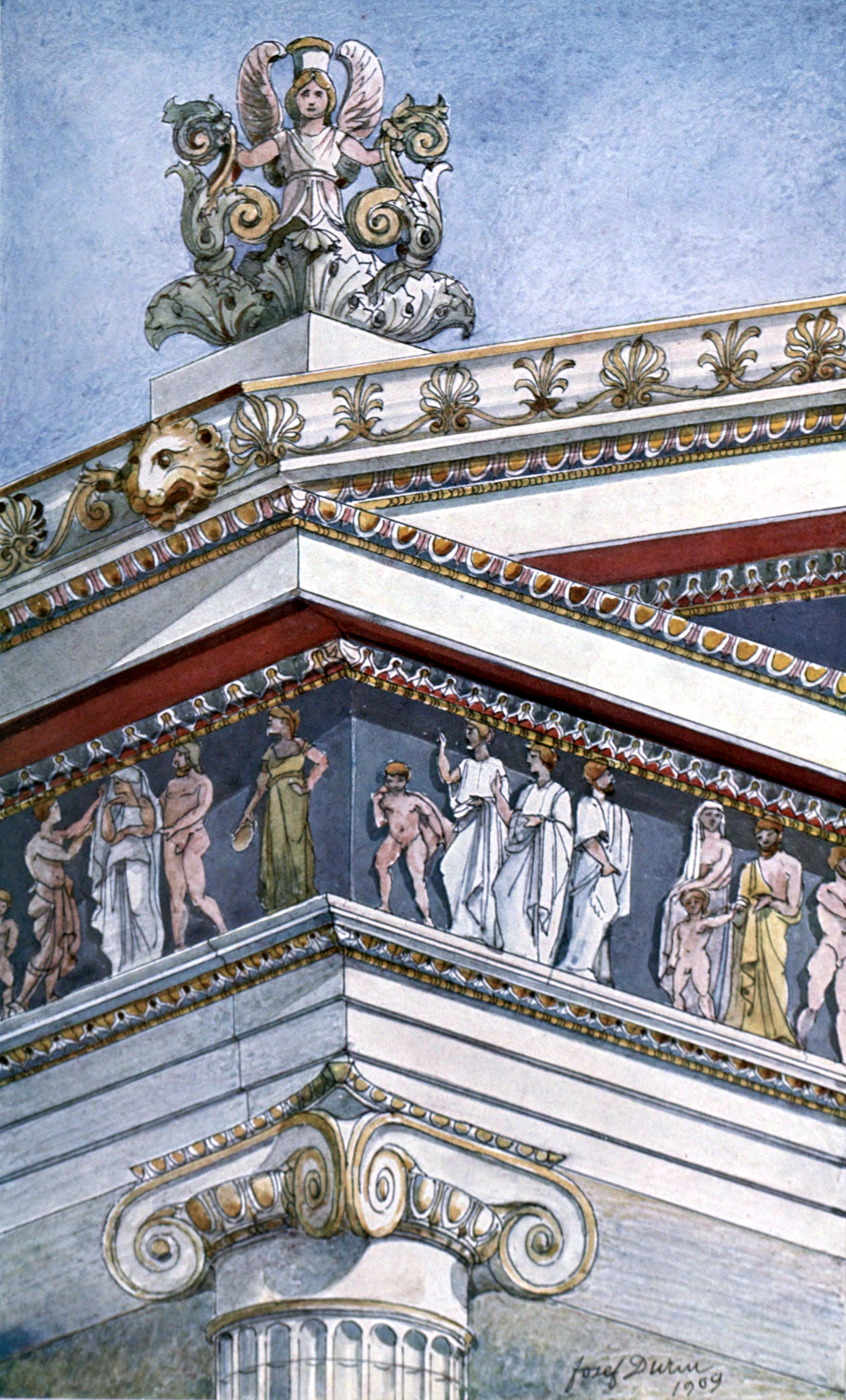
Original polychromy in Ionic temples

The Ionic order originated in the mid-6th century BC in Ionia (broadly equivalent to modern day İzmir Province), as well as the southwestern coastland and islands of Asia Minor settled by Ionians, where Ionic Greek was spoken. The Ionic order column was being practiced in mainland Greece in the 5th century BC. It was most popular in the Archaic Period (750–480 BC) in Ionia. The first of the great Ionic temples was the Temple of Hera on Samos, built about 570–560 BC by the architect Rhoikos. It stood for only a decade before it was leveled by an earthquake. A longer-lasting 6th century Ionic temple was the Temple of Artemis at Ephesus, one of the Seven Wonders of the Ancient World. The Parthenon, although it conforms mainly to the Doric order, also has some Ionic elements. A more purely Ionic mode to be seen on the Athenian Acropolis is exemplified in the Erechtheum.

Following the conquests of Alexander the Great in the east, a few examples of the Ionic order can be found as far as Pakistan with the Jandial temple near Taxila. Several examples of capitals displaying Ionic influences can be seen as far away as Patna, India, especially with the Pataliputra capital, dated to the 3rd century BC, and seemingly derived from the design of the Ionic anta capital, or the Sarnath capital, which has been described as "Perso-Ionic", or "quasi-Ionic".

Vitruvius, a practicing architect who worked in the time of Augustus, reports that the Doric column had its initial basis in the proportions of the male body, while Ionic columns took on a "slenderness" inspired by the female body. Though he does not name his source for such a self-conscious and "literary" approach, it must be in traditions passed on from Hellenistic architects, such as Hermogenes of Priene, the architect of a famed temple of Artemis at Magnesia on the Meander in Lydia (now Turkey).

Renaissance architectural theorists took his hints to interpret the Ionic order as matronly in comparison to the Doric order, though not as wholly feminine as the Corinthian order. The Ionic is a natural order for post-Renaissance libraries and courts of justice, learned and civilized. Because no treatises on classical architecture survive earlier than that of Vitruvius, identification of such "meaning" in architectural elements as it was understood in the 5th and 4th centuries BC remains tenuous, though during the Renaissance it became part of the conventional "speech" of classicism.

From the 17th century onwards, a much admired and copied version of Ionic was that which could be seen in the Temple of Fortuna Virilis in Rome, first clearly presented in a detailed engraving in Antoine Desgodetz, Les edifices antiques de Rome (Paris 1682).

== Applications ==
The Ionic order may be used in conjunction with the Doric and Corinthian order, as seen in Pausanias's description of the temple of Athena Alea, as featuring columns from all three styles. Pausanias names Scopas as the architect.

Pausanias also mentions a treasury chamber set up by Delphi in the Ionic style (next to a matching Doric), built out of bronze.

== Gallery ==
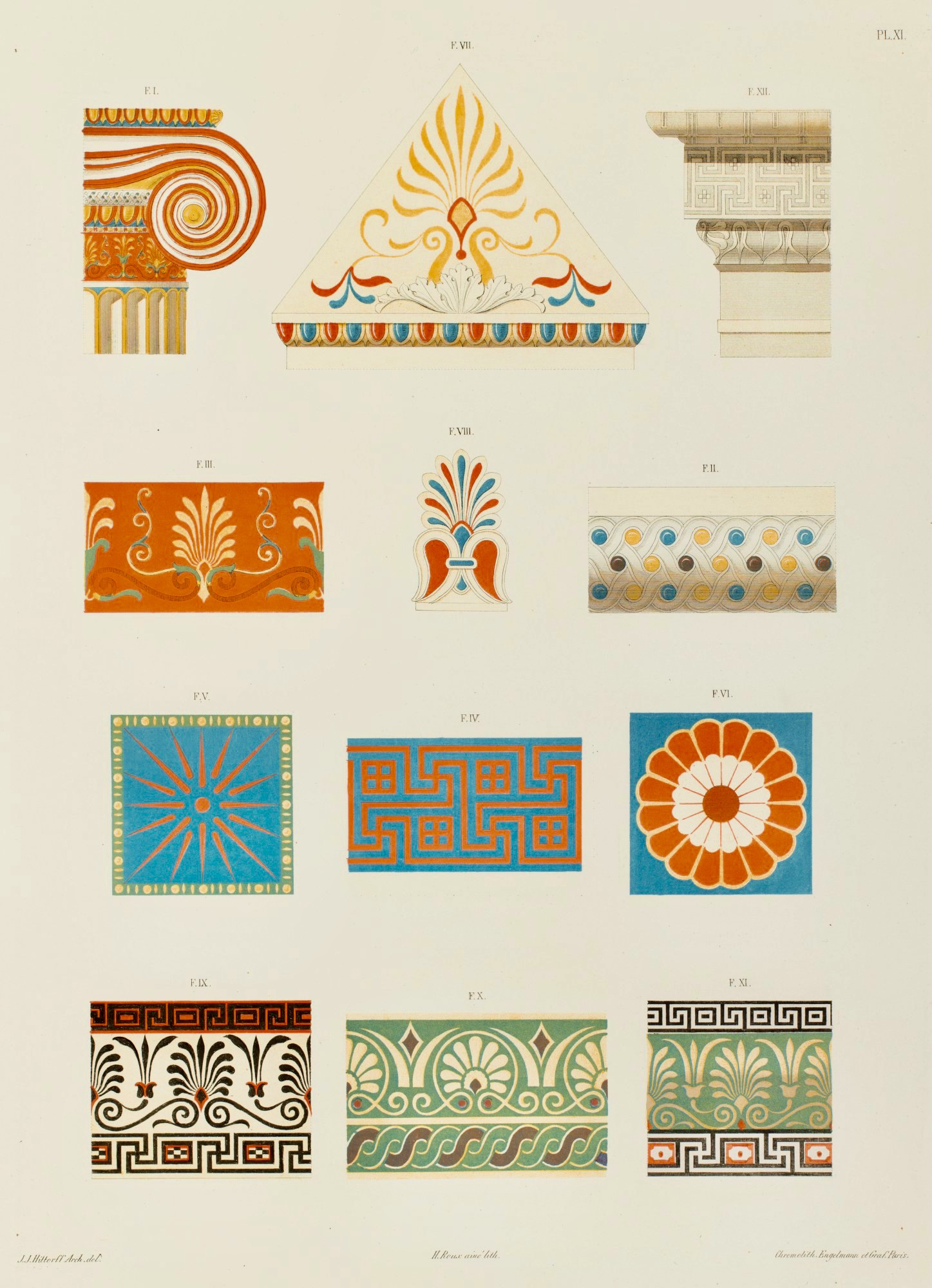
19th century illustration of multiple polychrome elements of Ancient Greek architecture, including an Ionic capital in the top left, by Jacques Ignace Hittorff

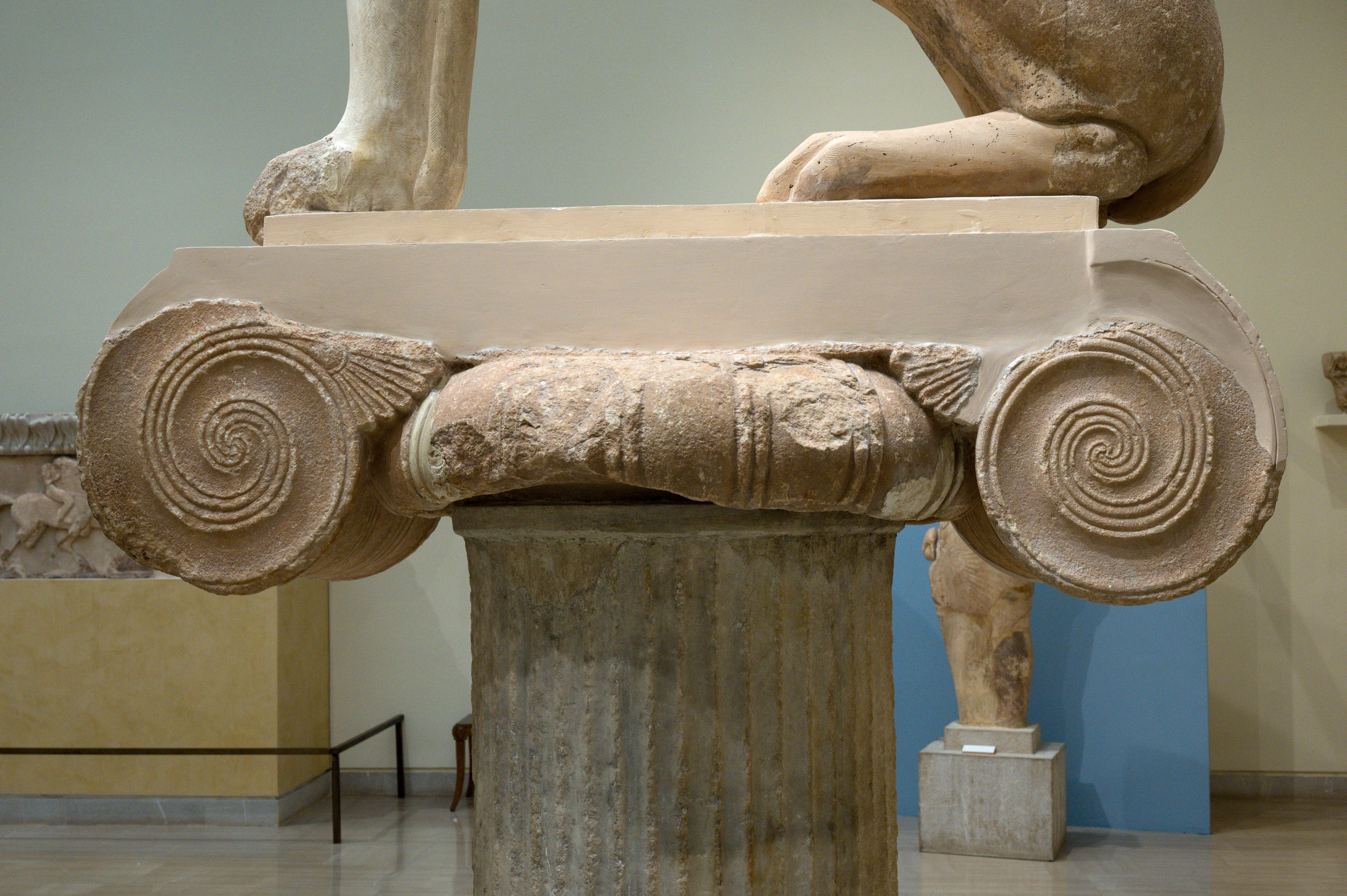
Ancient Greek Archaic Ionic capital of the Sphinx of Naxos, c.560 BC, Naxian marble, Delphi Archaeological Museum, Delphi, Greece

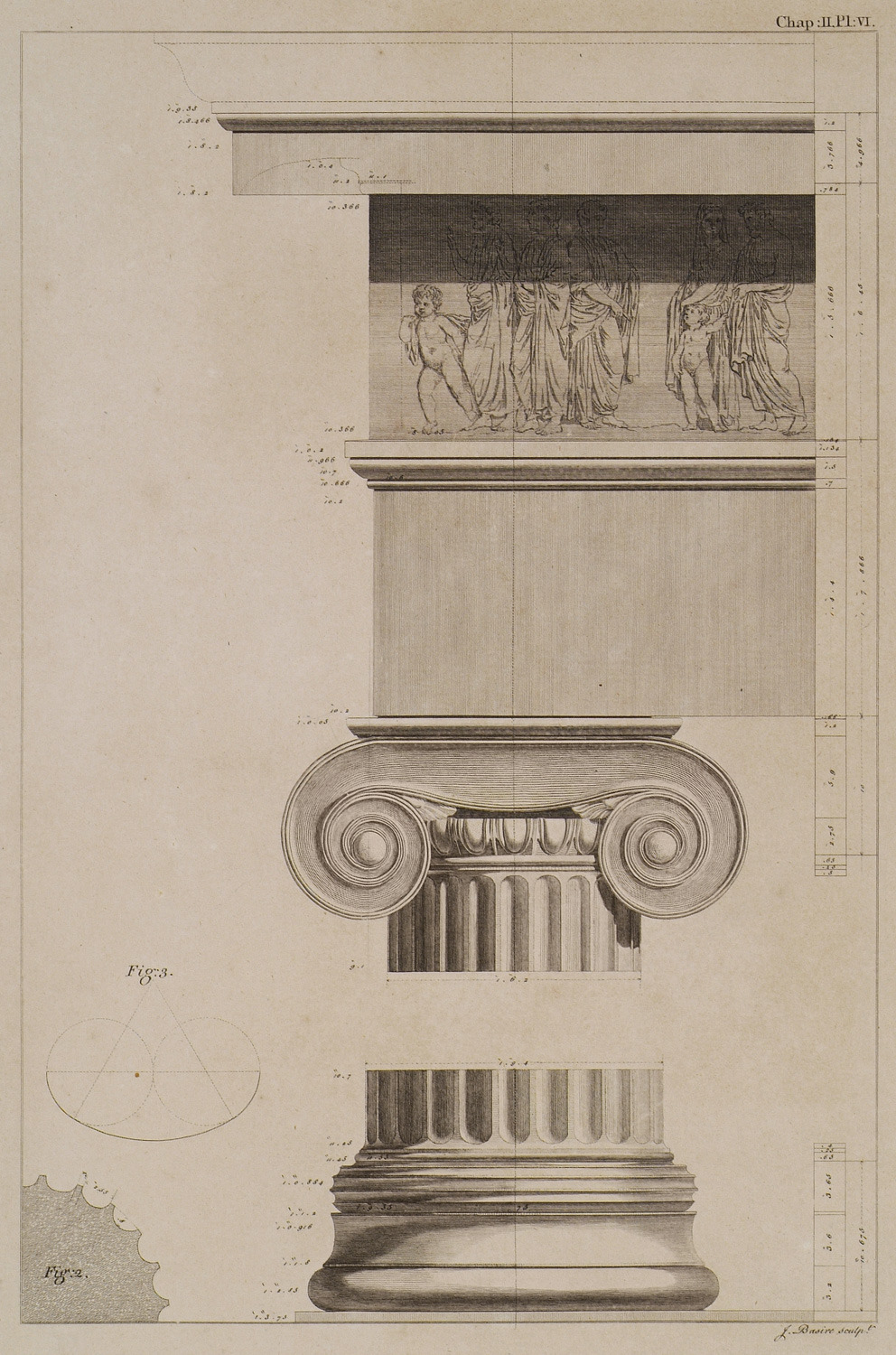
Ancient Greek Ionic order of the Temple of Artemis Agrotera, Athens, c.440 BC-destroyed in 1778

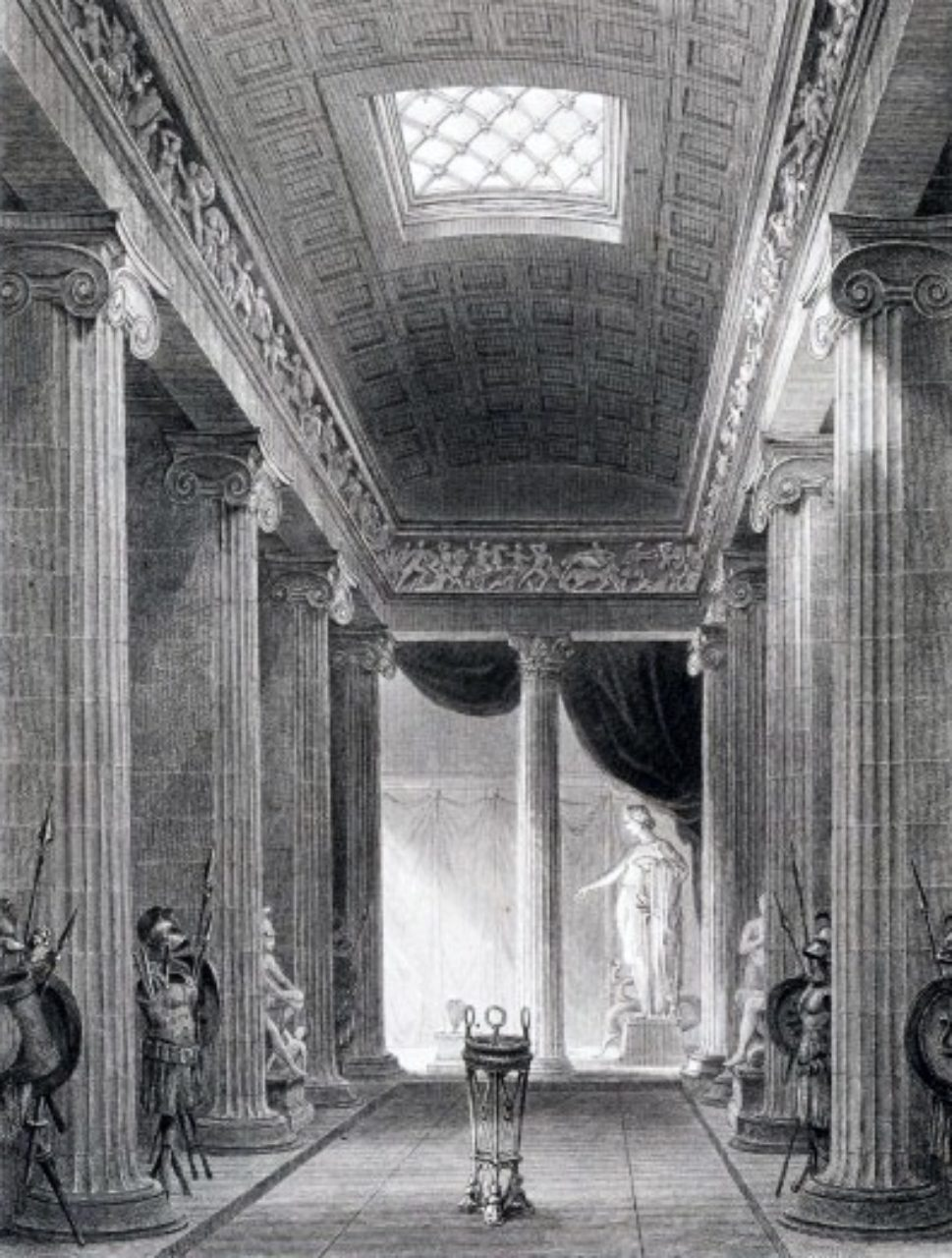
Ancient Greek Ionic columns in the Temple of Apollo, Bassae, Greece, illustration by Charles Robert Cockerell, unknown architect, c.429–400 BC

Compared Ionic order with Doric, Tuscan, Corinthian and Composite orders; with stereobate

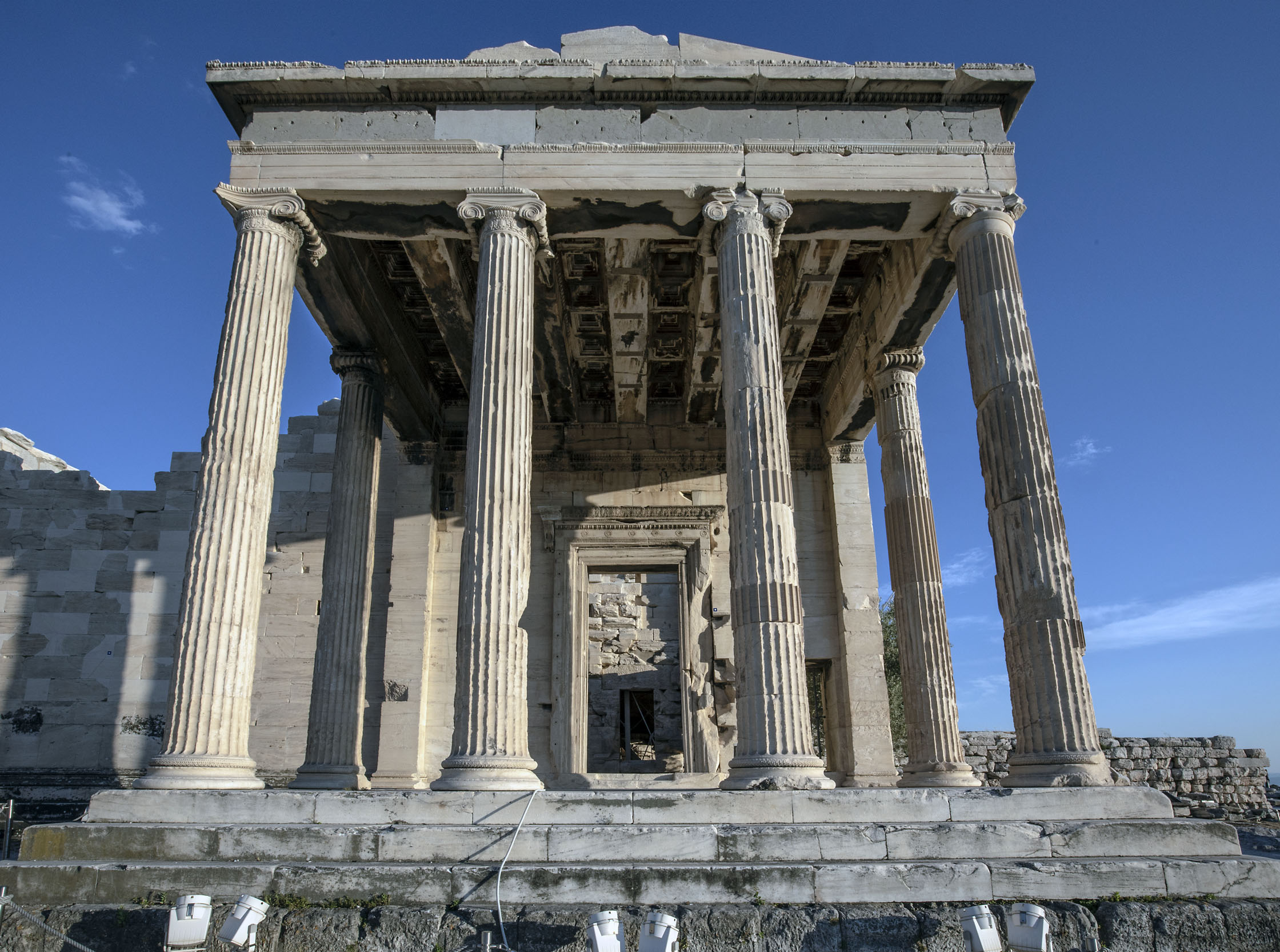
Ancient Greek Ionic columns of the Erechtheion, Athens, Greece, with parallel volutes, unknown architect, 421–405 BC

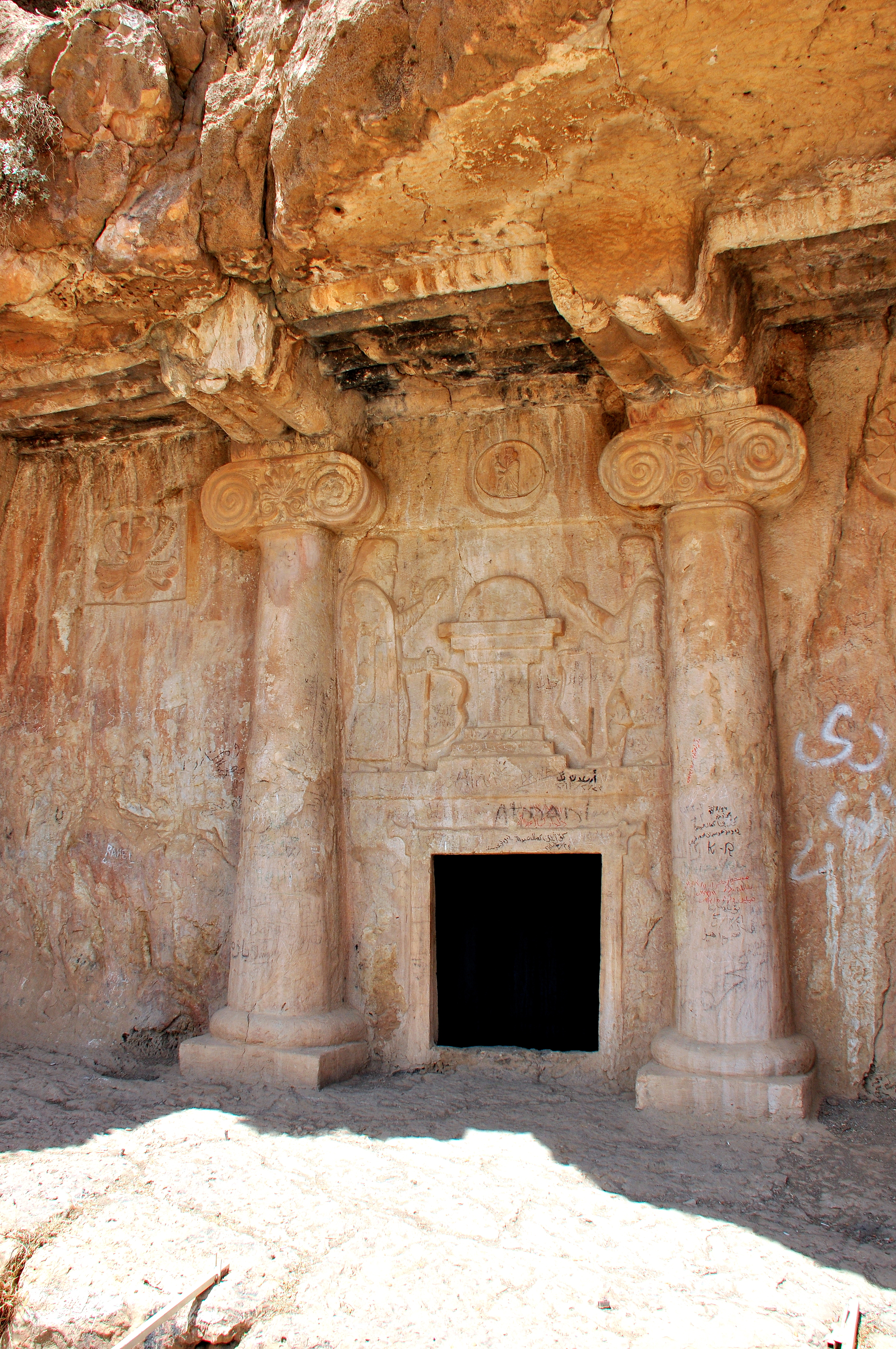
Ancient Near Eastern Ionic columns of a rock-cut tomb at Qyzqapan, Iraq, unknown architect, 5th–4th centuries BC

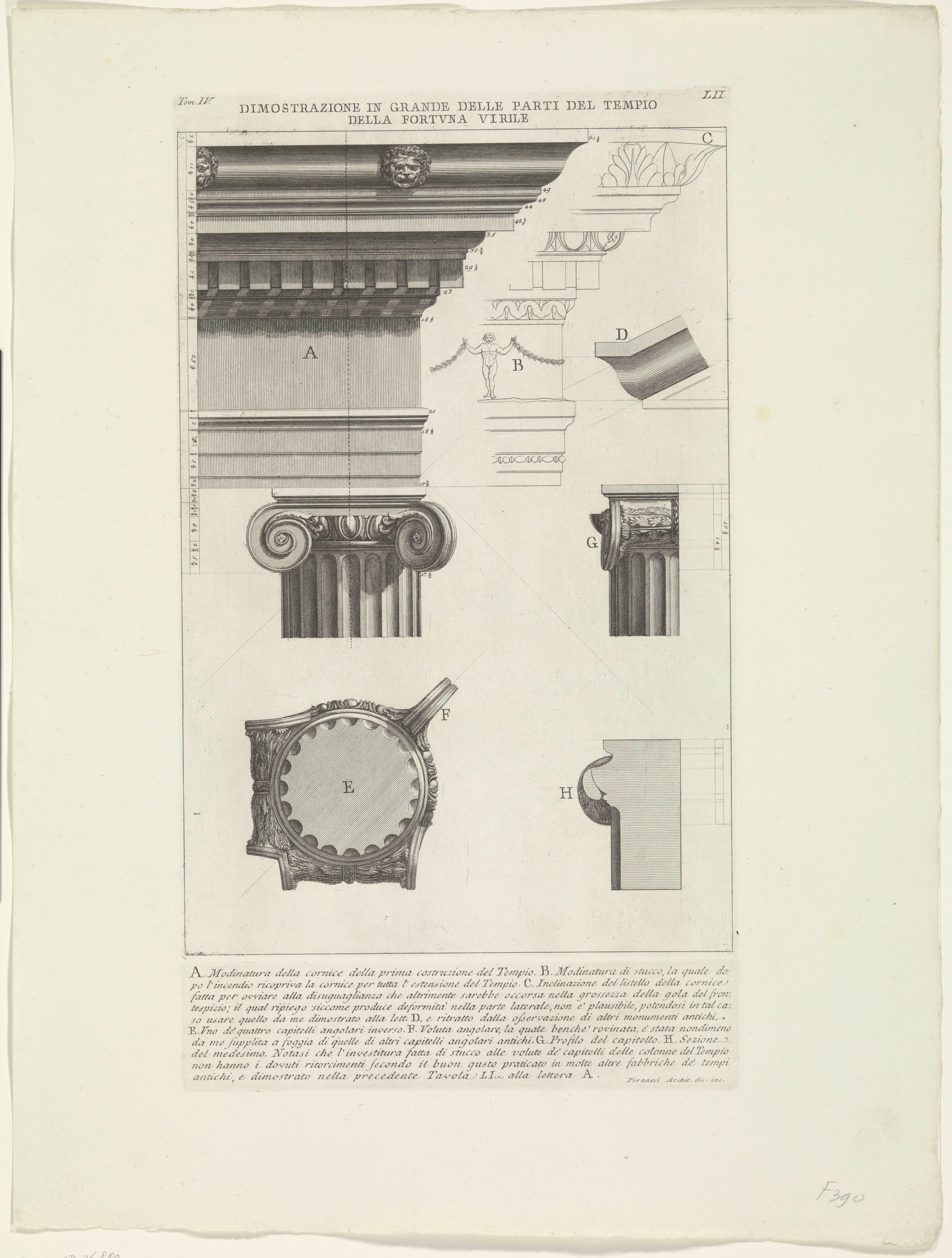
Roman Ionic corner capital from the Temple of Portunus, Rome, with two sides with volutes, and one for the corner of the facade projecting at a 45° angle, unknown architect, early 4th century BC

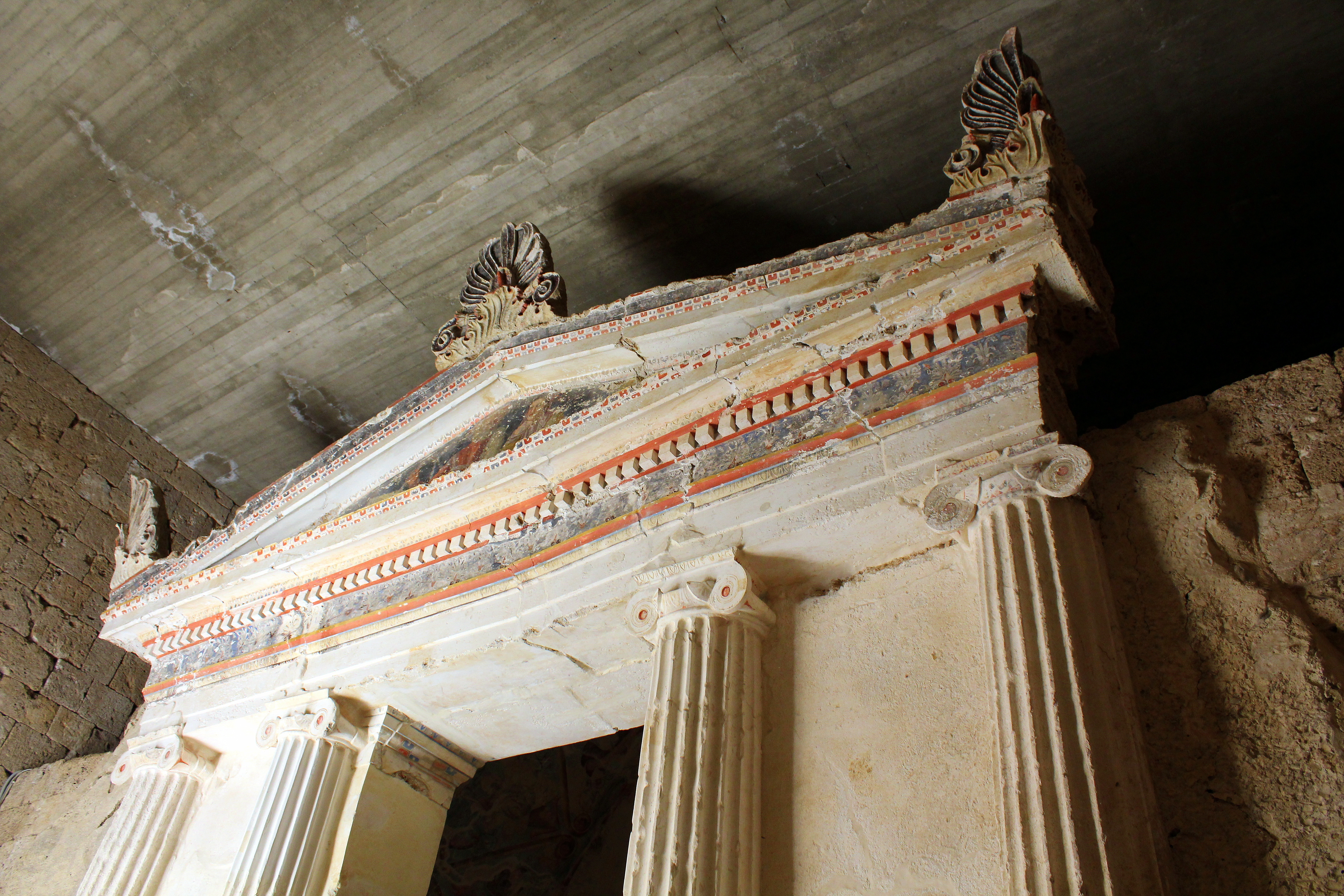
Greek engaged Ionic columns of the Tomb of the Palmettes, Mieza, unknown architect, 3rd century BC

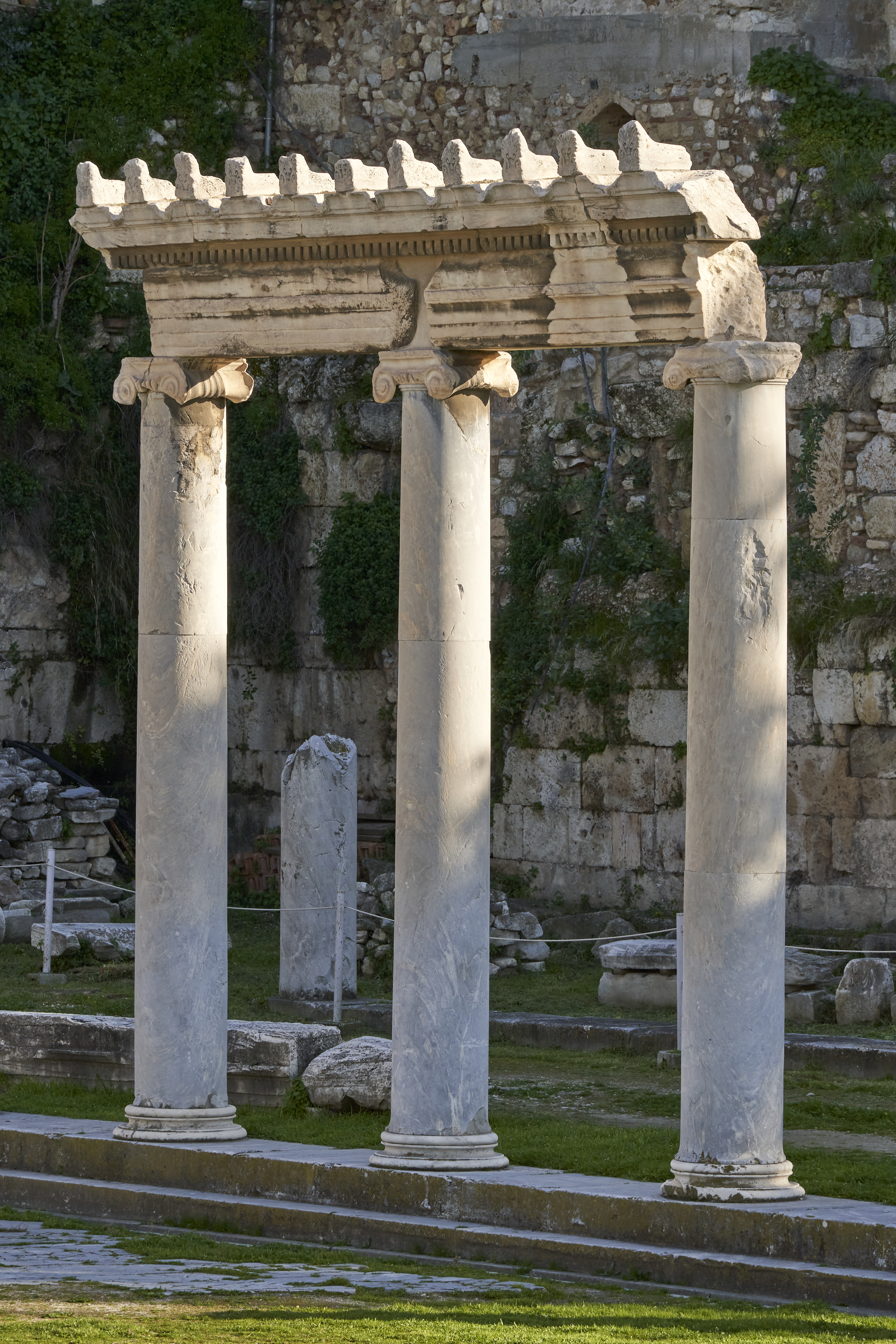
Roman Ionic columns of the Roman Agora, Athens, Greece, unknown architect, 1st century BC

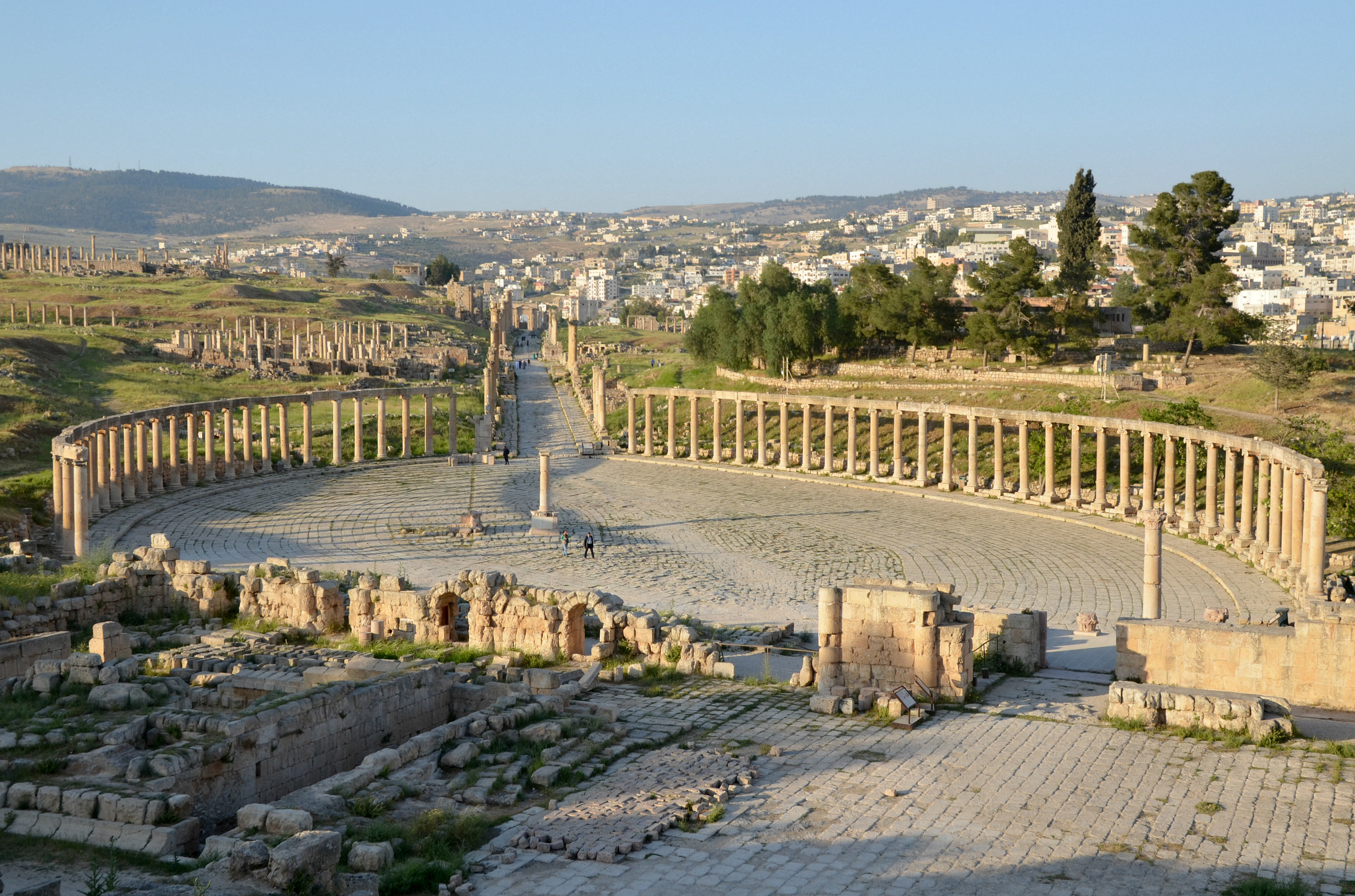
Roman Ionic columns of a colonnade of the oval plaza in Jerash, Jordan, unknown architect, 2nd–3rd centuries AD

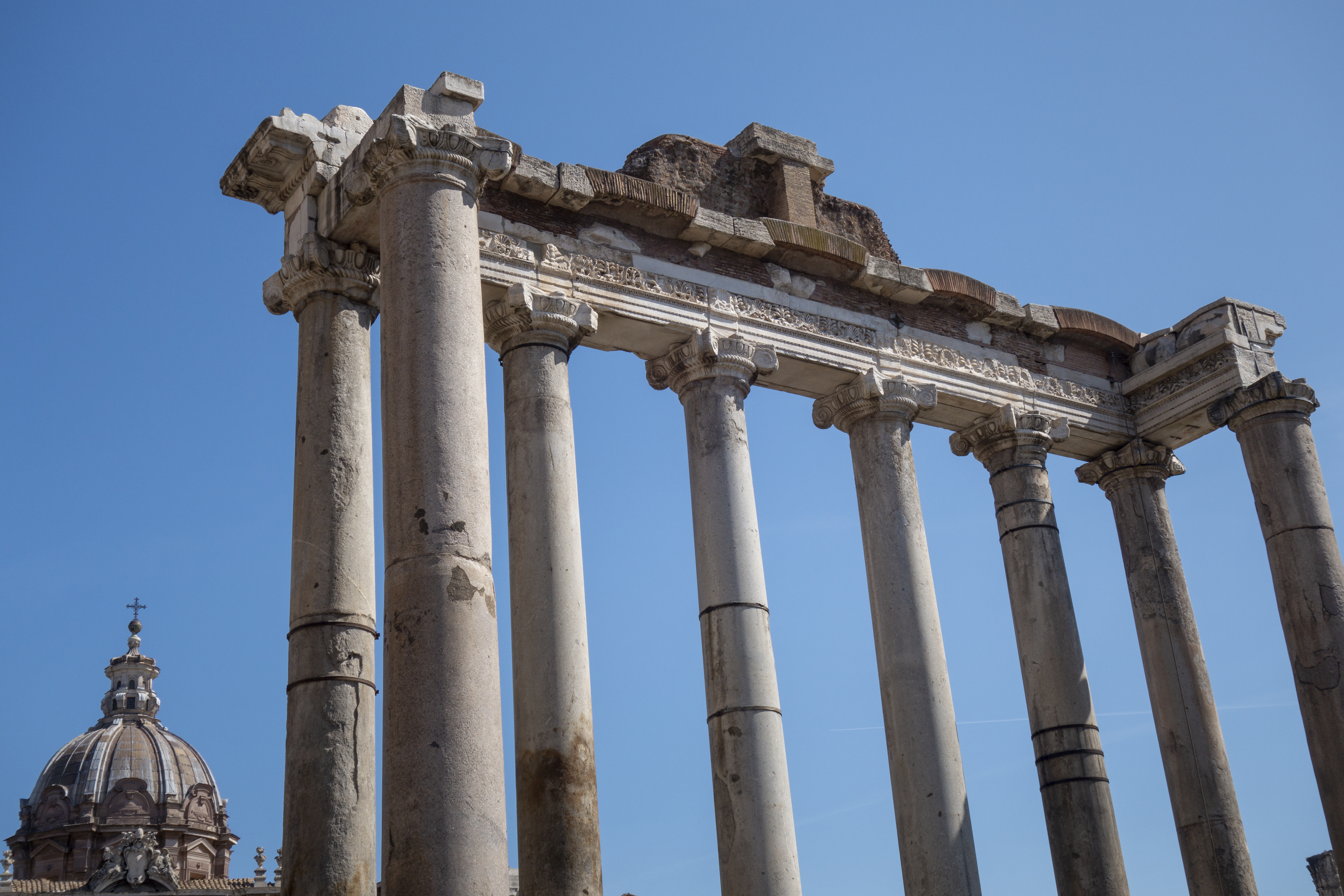
Roman Ionic columns of the Temple of Saturn, Rome, with diagonal volutes, unknown architect, 3rd of 4th centuries

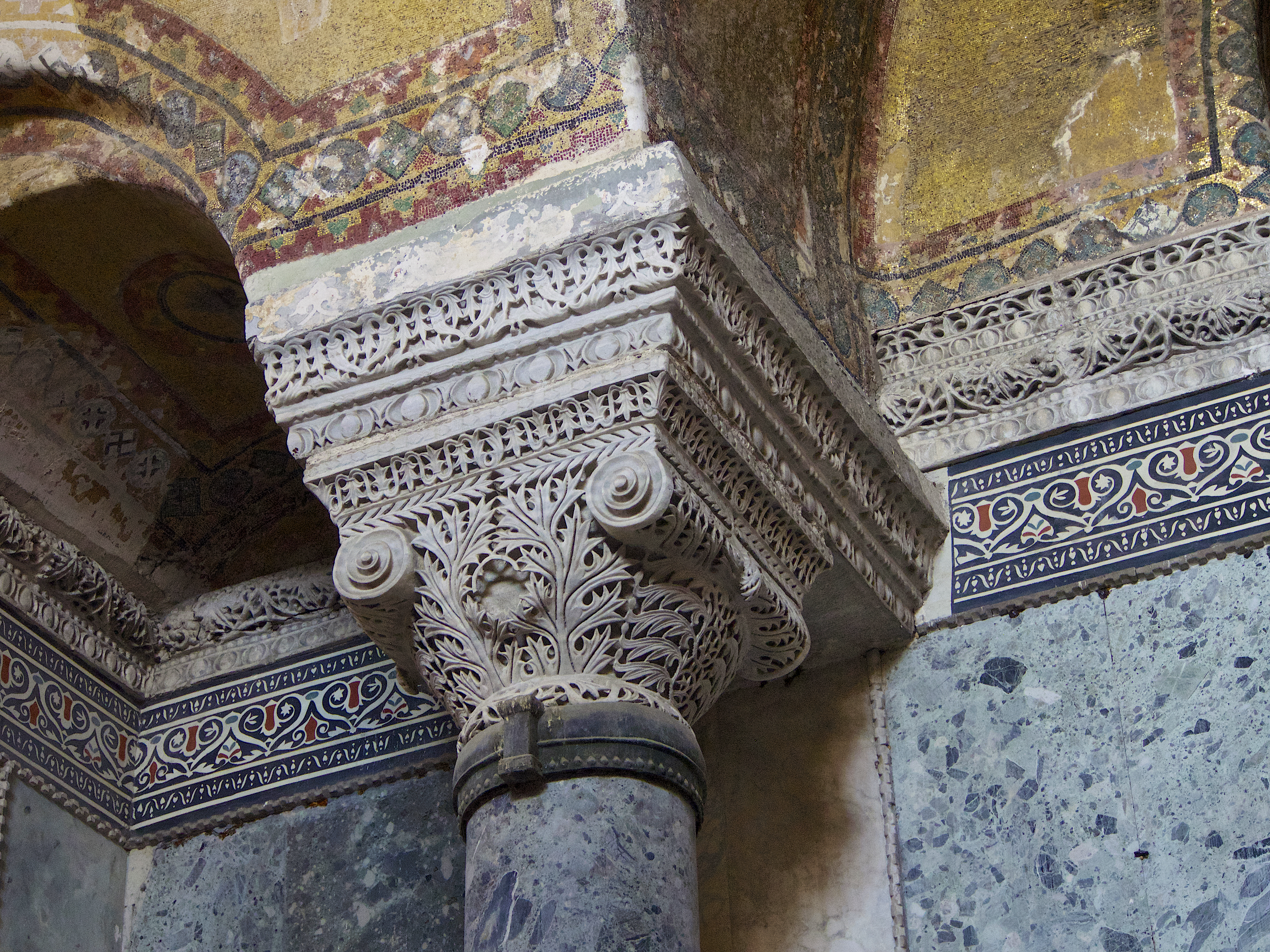
Byzantine Ionic capital in the Hagia Sophia, Istanbul, Turkey, by Anthemius of Tralles or Isidore of Miletus, 6th century

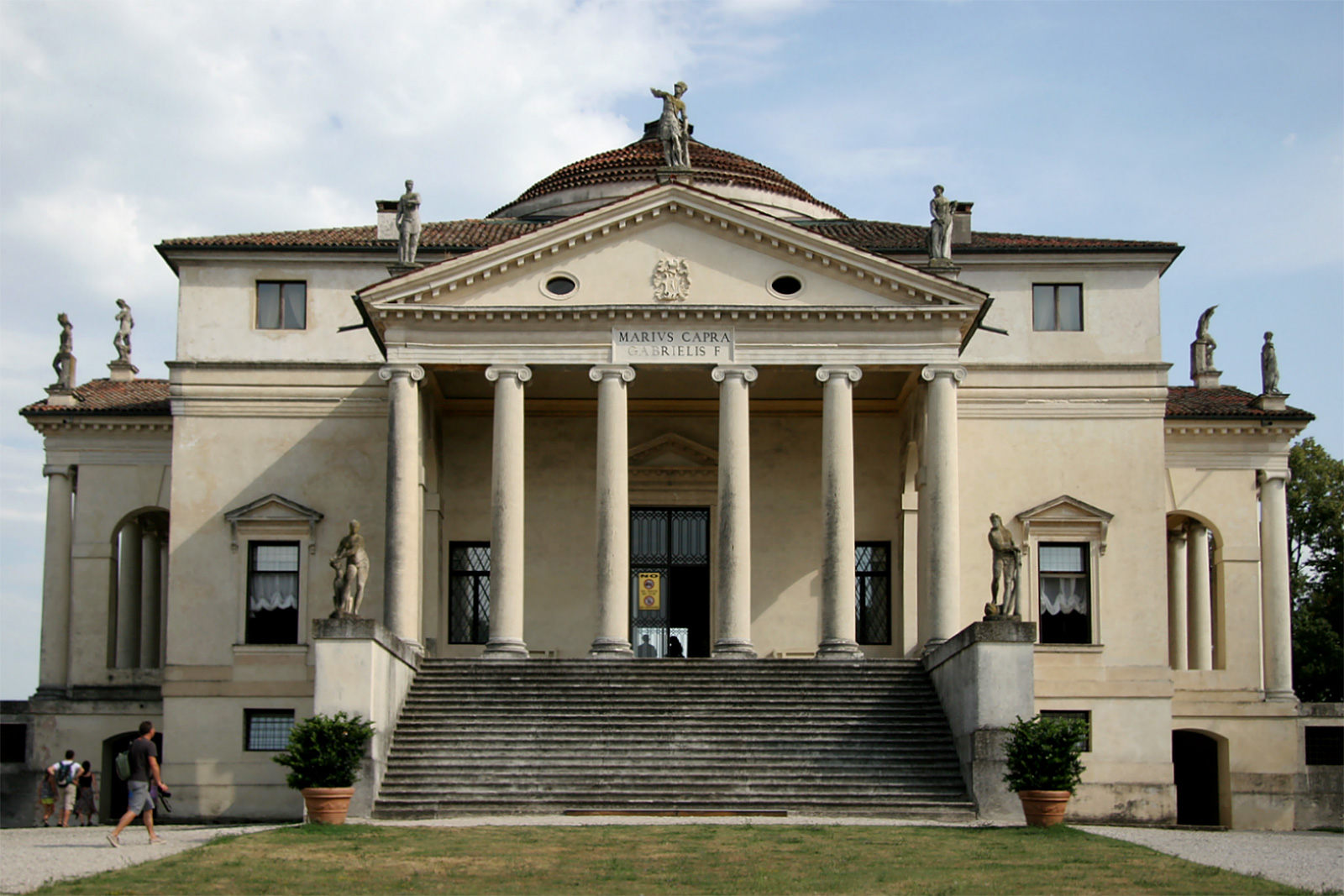
Renaissance Ionic columns of the Villa La Rotonda, outside Vicenza, Italy, by Andrea Palladio, 1567–1605

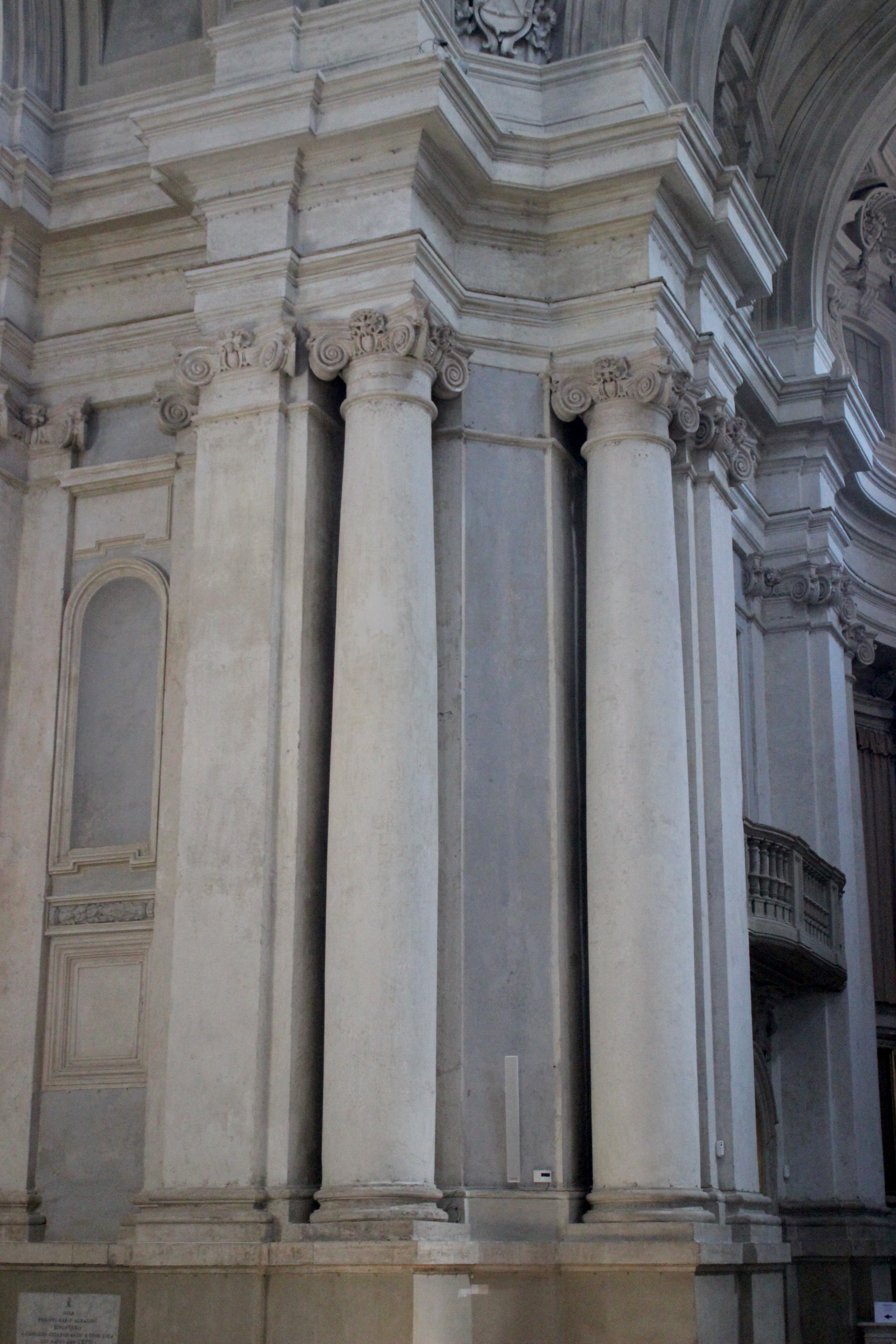
Baroque Ionic columns in the Santi Luca e Martina, Rome, by Pietro da Cortona, 1634-1669

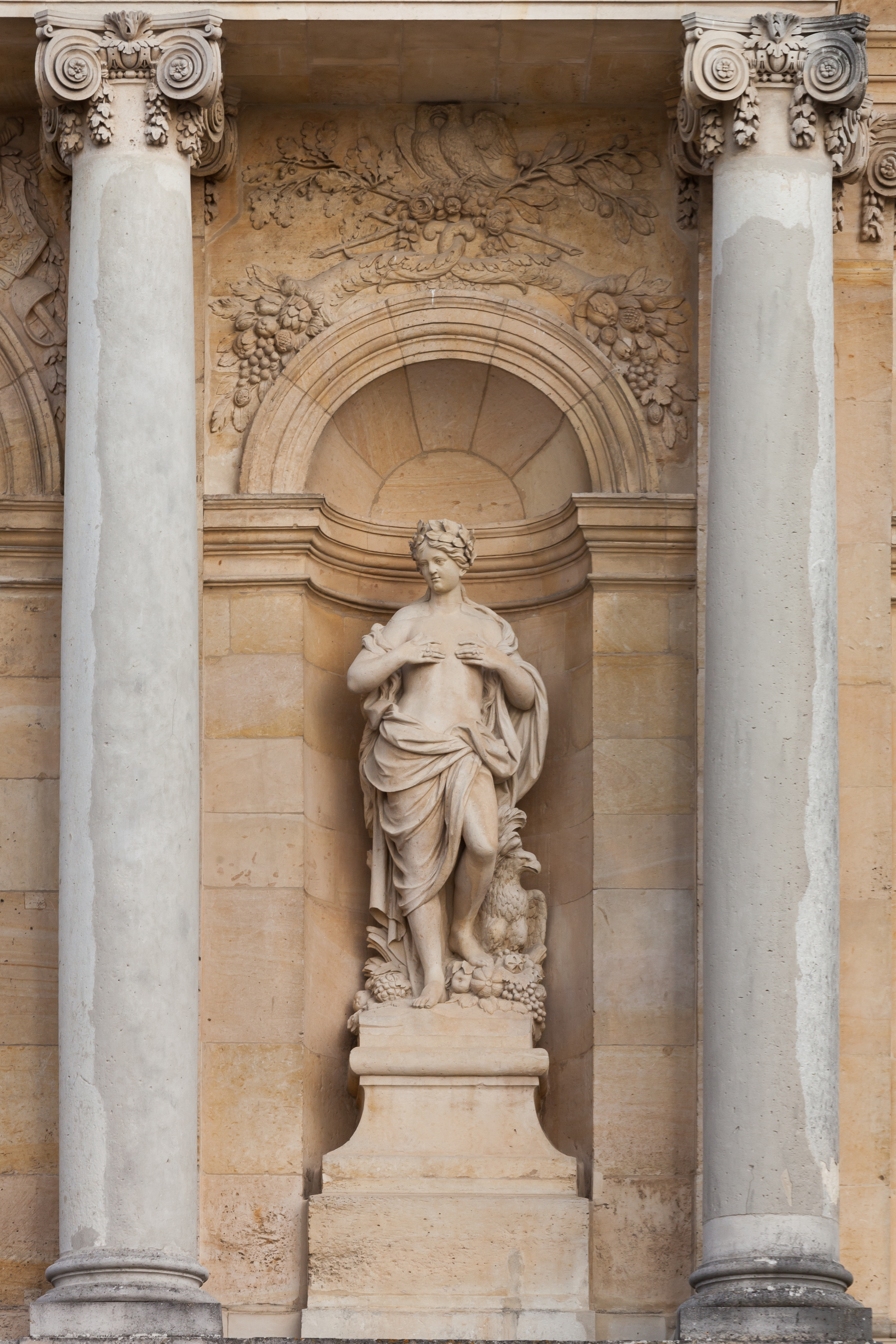
Baroque Ionic columns on the garden façade of the Palace of Versailles, Versailles, France, by Jules Hardouin-Mansart, 1678–1688

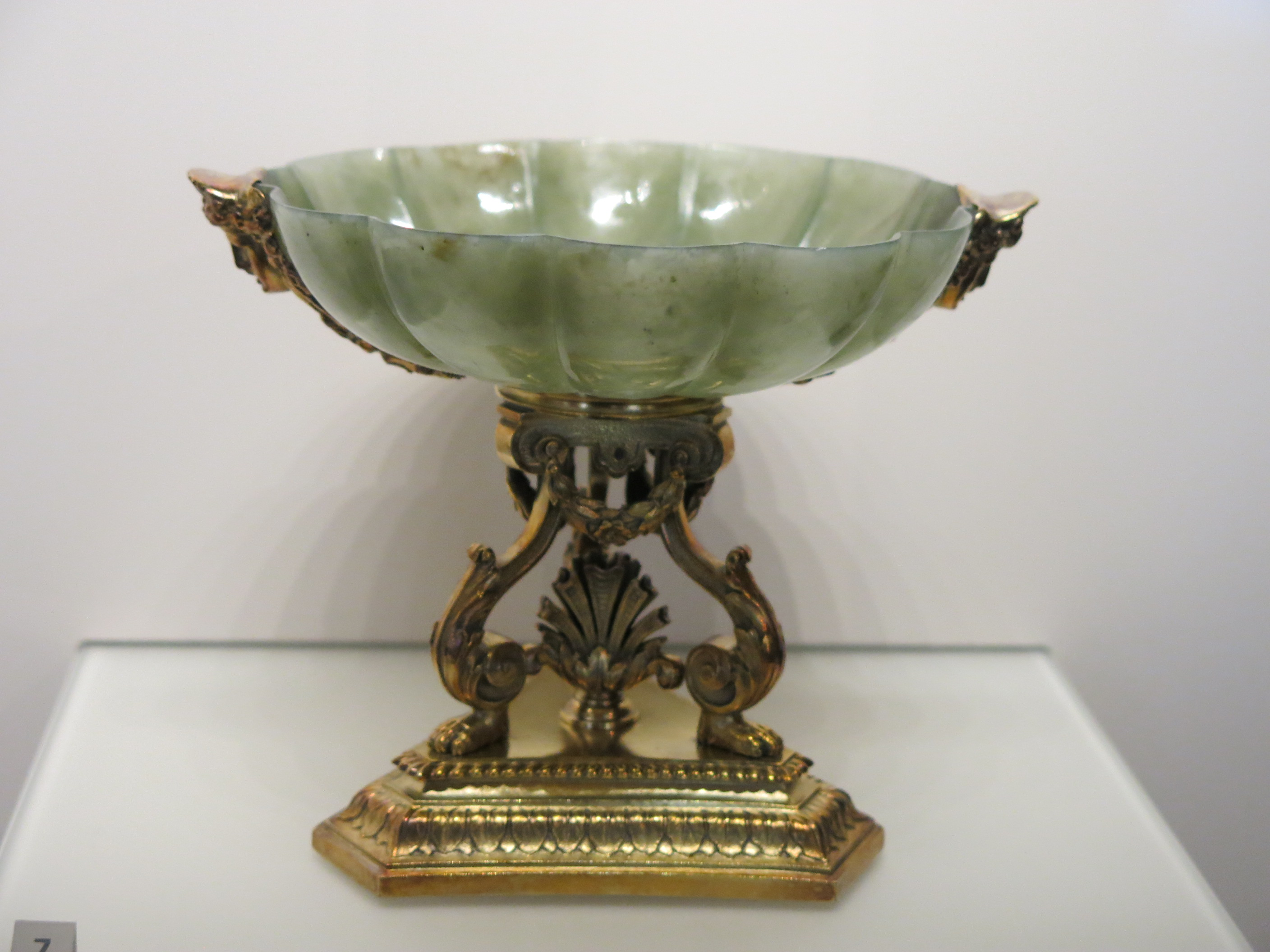
Baroque Ionic capital at the top of the base of a cup, by Michel Debourg, 1686–1687, jade and gilded silver, Louvre

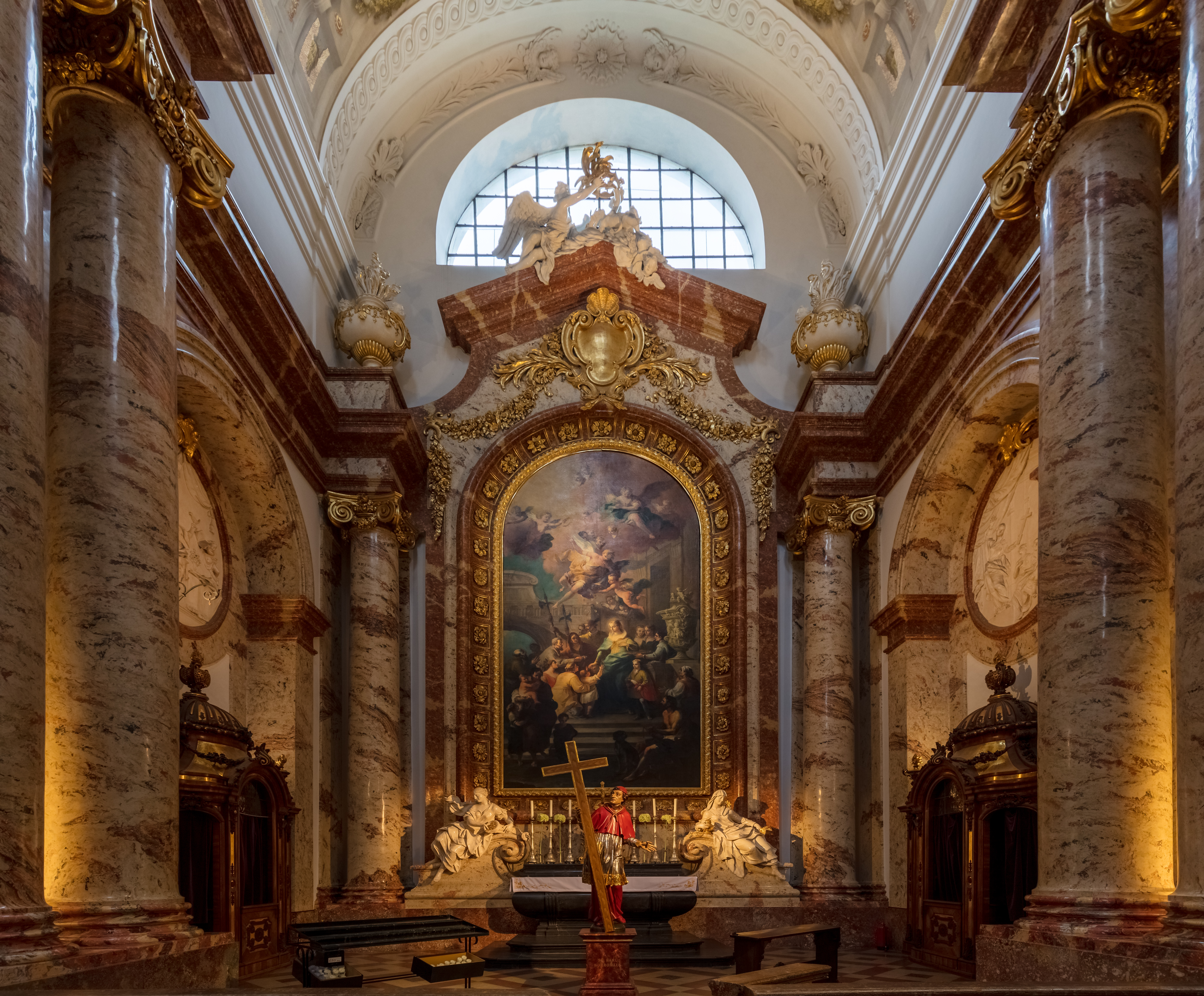
Baroque Ionic columns in the Karlskirche, Vienna, Austria, 1715–1737, by Johann Bernhard Fischer von Erlach

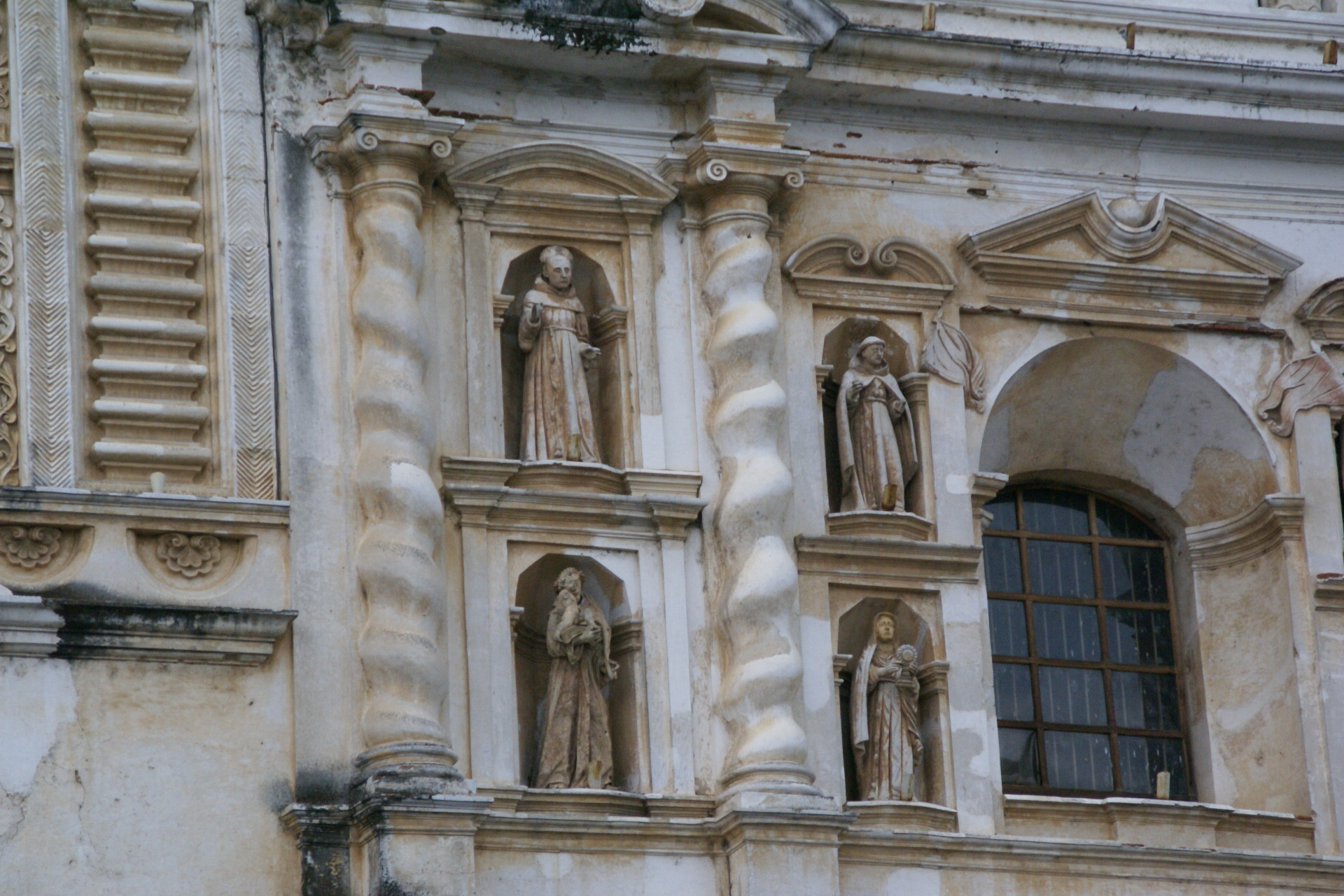
Baroque Solomonic Ionic columns of the Monastery of San Francisco, Antigua, Guatemala, unknown architect, early 17th century

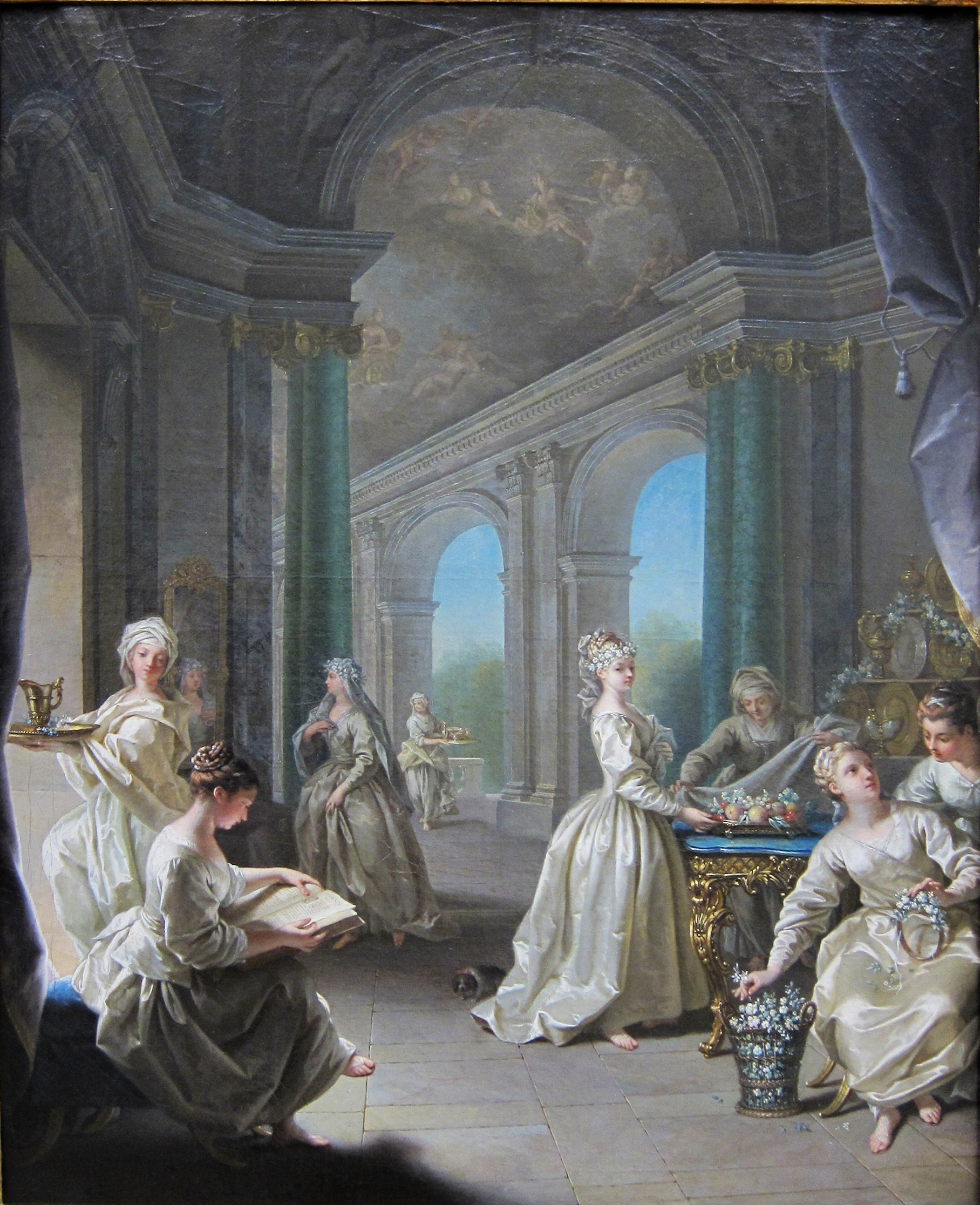
Rococo Ionic columns in Vierges modernes, painted by Jean Raoux, 1728, oil on canvas, Palais des Beaux-Arts de Lille, Lille, France

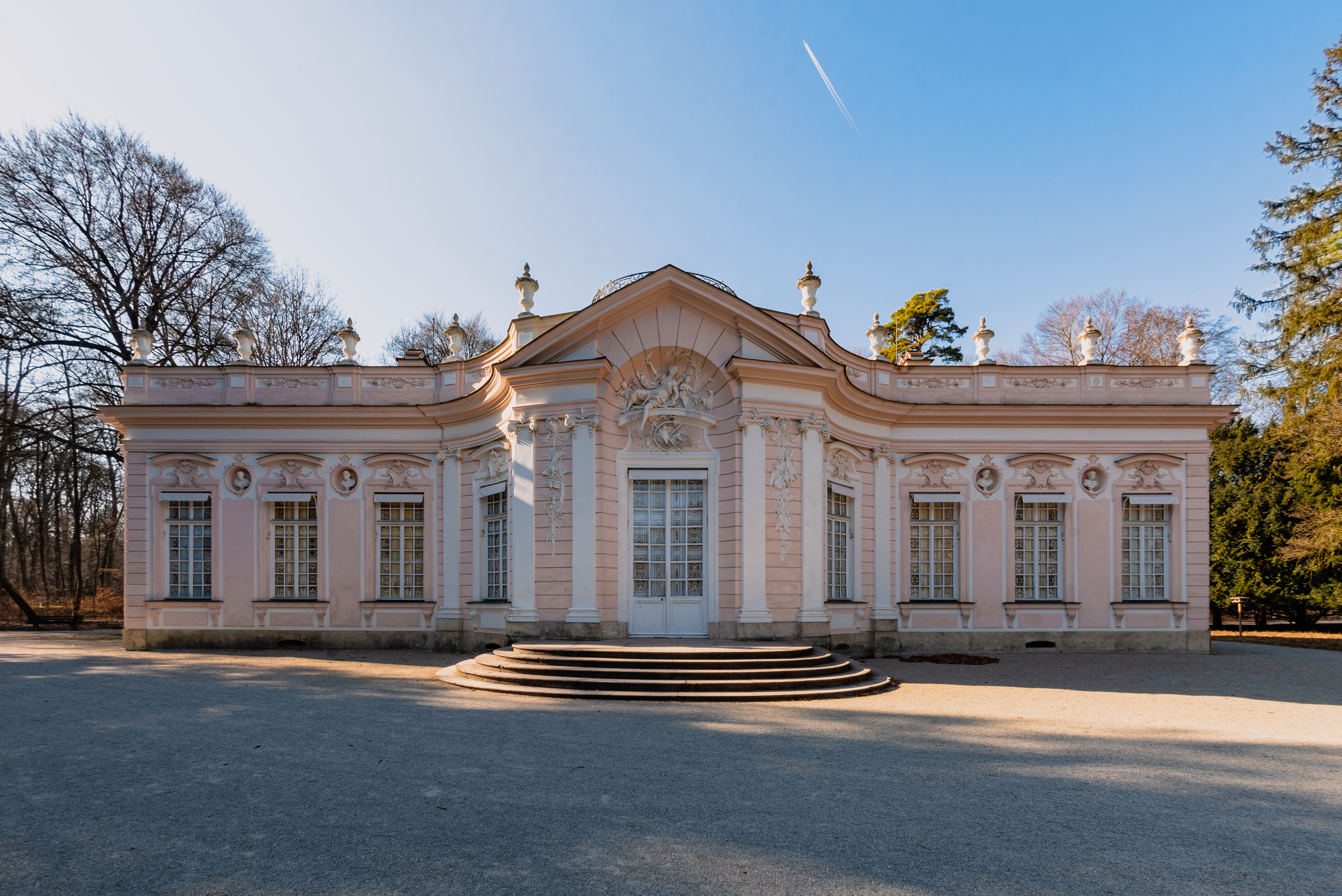
Rococo Ionic pilasters on the facade of the Amalienburg, Nymphenburg Palace Park, Munich, Germany, by François de Cuvilliés, 1734–1739

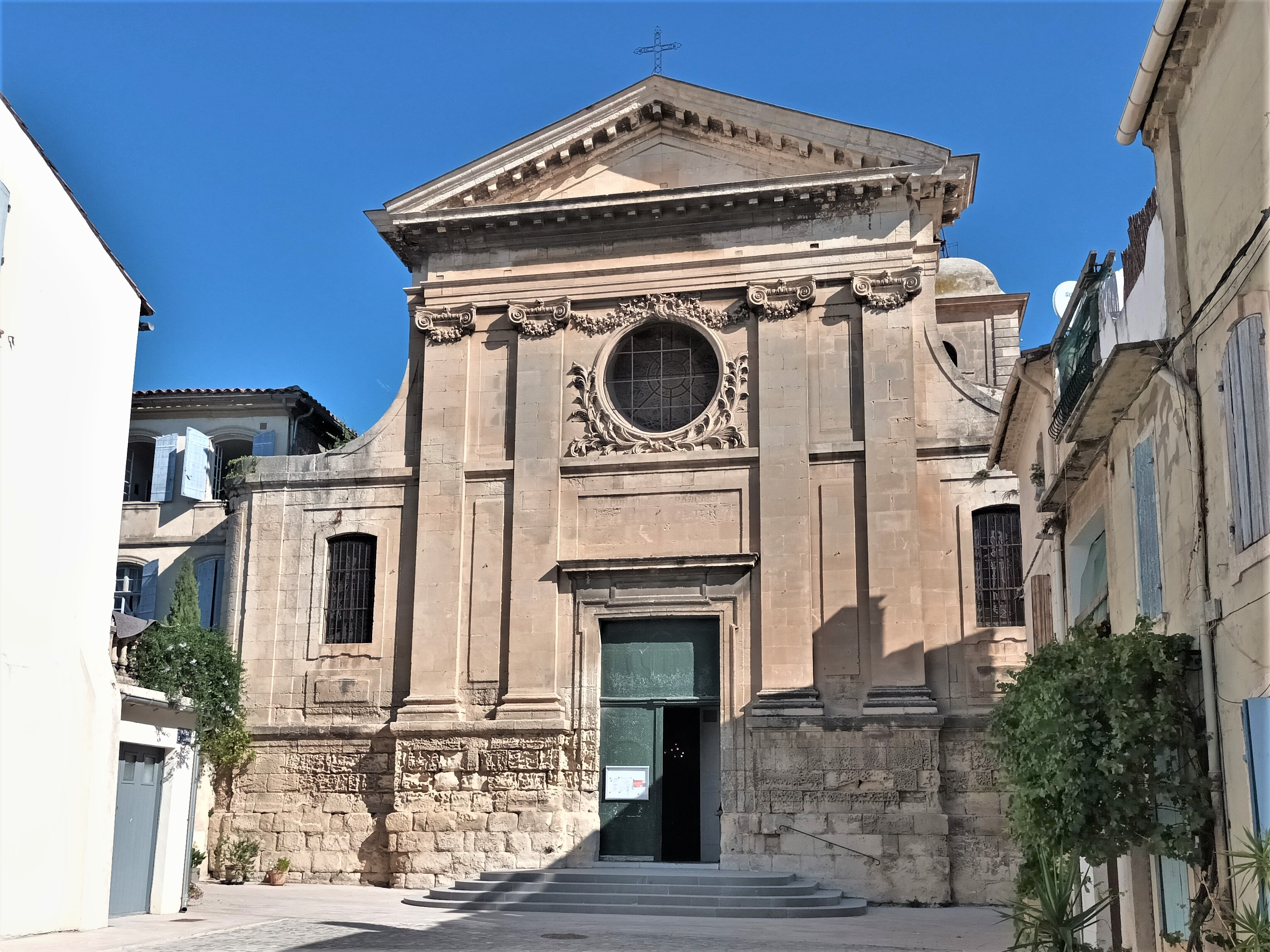
Rococo pilasters on the facade of the Église Saint-Jacques de Tarascon, Tarascon, France, by Jean-Baptiste Franque and Antoine Damour, 2nd half of the 18th century

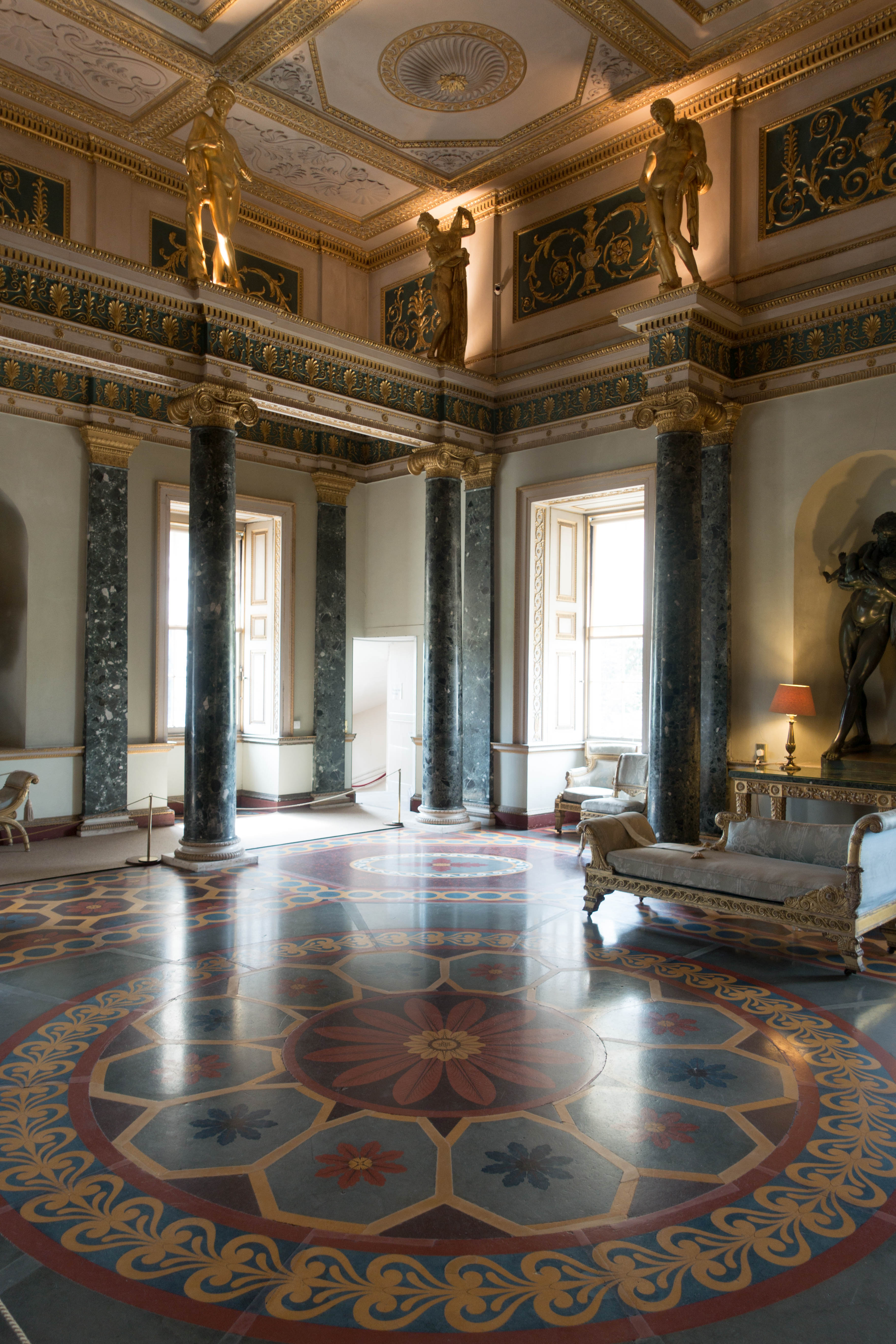
Neoclassical Ionic columns at Syon House, London, by Robert Adam, c.1761–1765

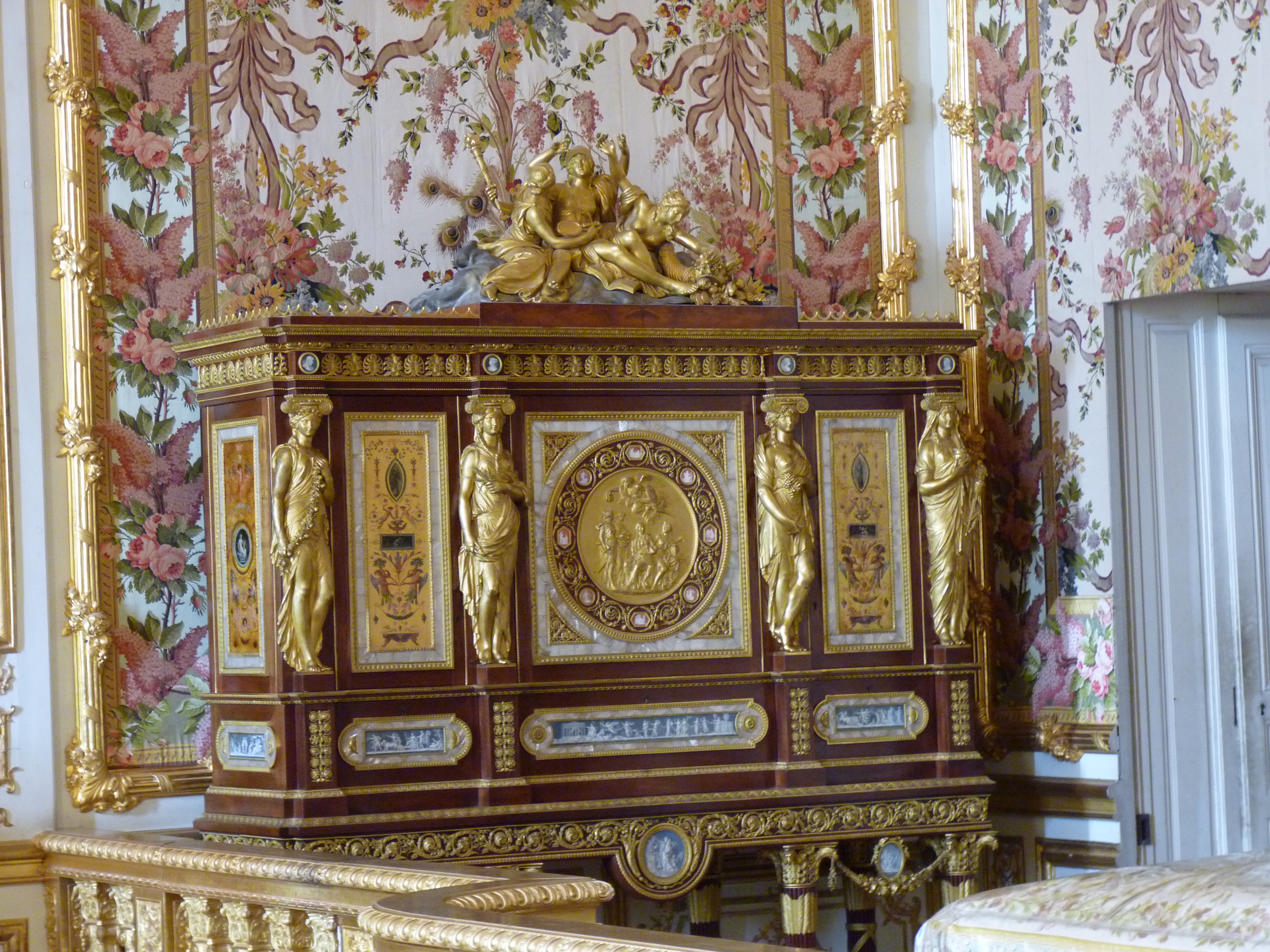
Louis XVI style caryatids with Ionic capitals on their heads, on a jewelry locket of Marie-Antoinette, by Ferdinand Schwerdfeger, 1787, mahogany, mother-of-pearl inlays, paintings under glass, porcelain plate, and gilded bronzes, Chambre de la Reine, Palace of Versailles, Versailles, France

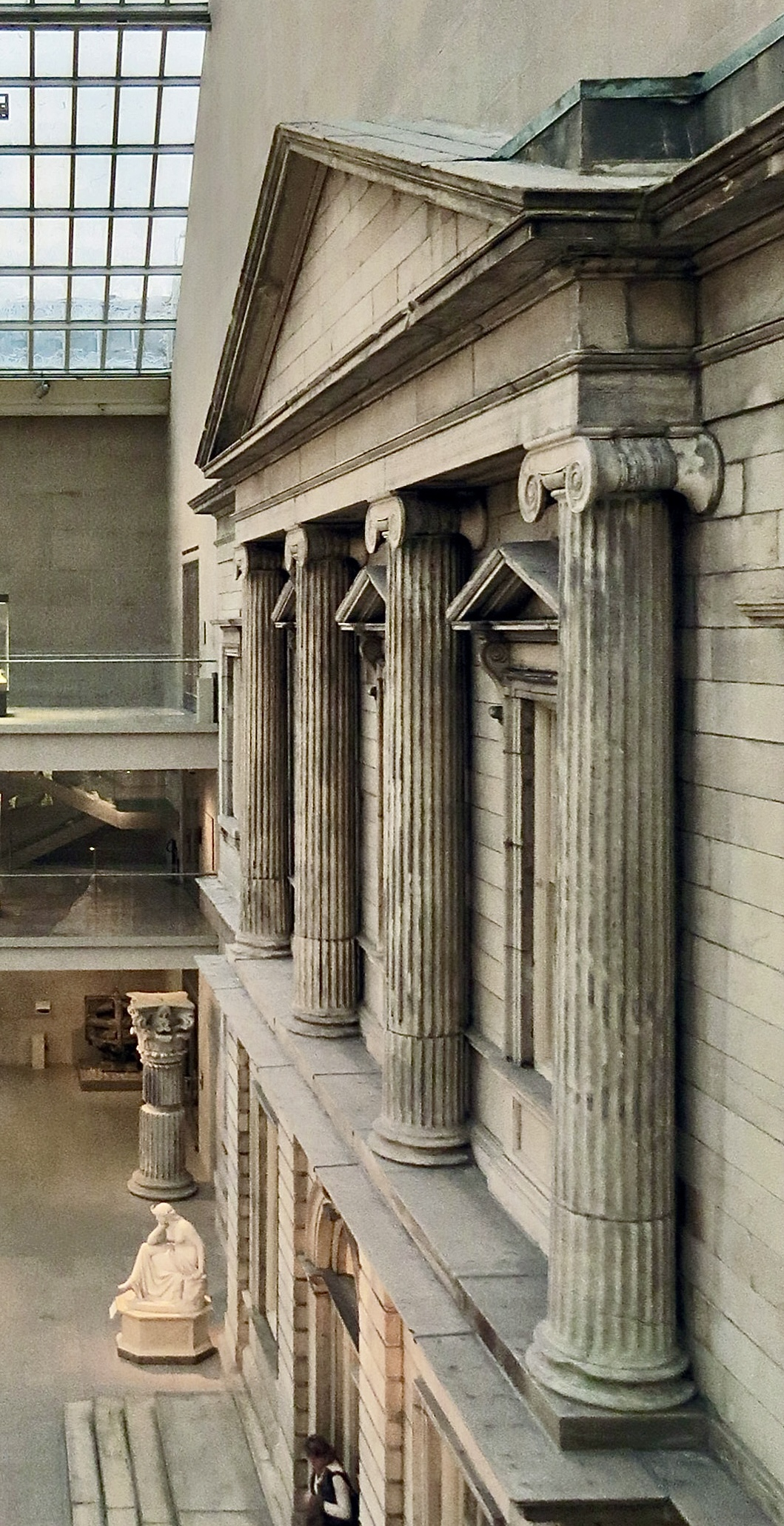
Greek Revival Ionic columns of the Branch Bank of the United States, now in the Charles Engelhard Court of the Metropolitan Museum of Art, New York City, inspired by those of the Temple of Artemis Agrotera in Athens, by Martin E. Thompson, 1824

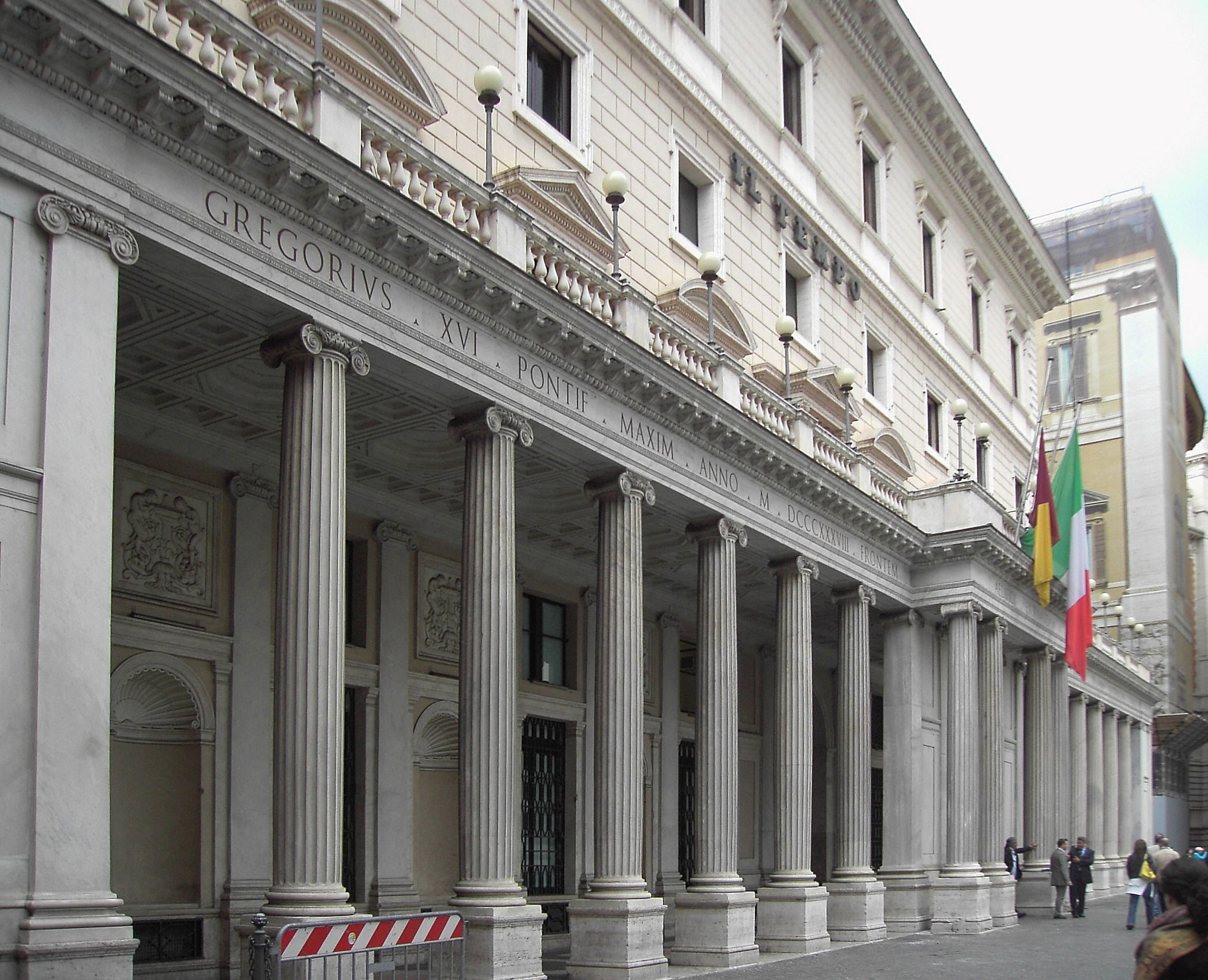
Roman Ionic columns of the Palazzo Wedekind, moved from the ruins of Veii, 1838

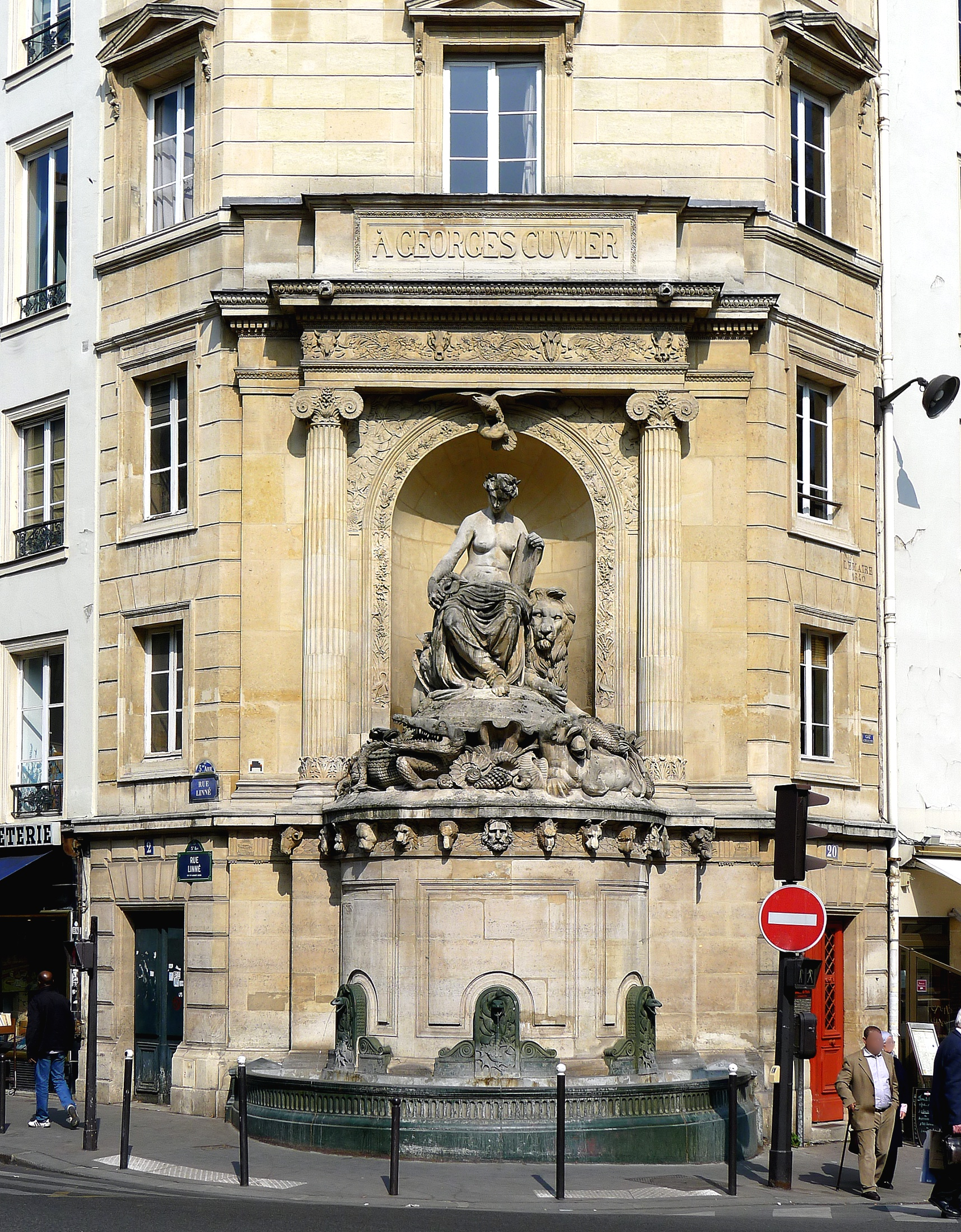
Neoclassical reinterpetation of the Ionic order, with acanthuses just above the base and ram horn-shaped volutes, of the Fontaine Cuvier, Paris, designed by Alphonse Vigoureux and sculpted by Jean-Jacques Feuchère and Pierre-Jules Pomateau, 1840–1846

Greek Revival Ionic columns of the main building of the Academy of Athens, inspired by those of the Erechtheum in Athens, by Theophilus Hansen, 1859–1885

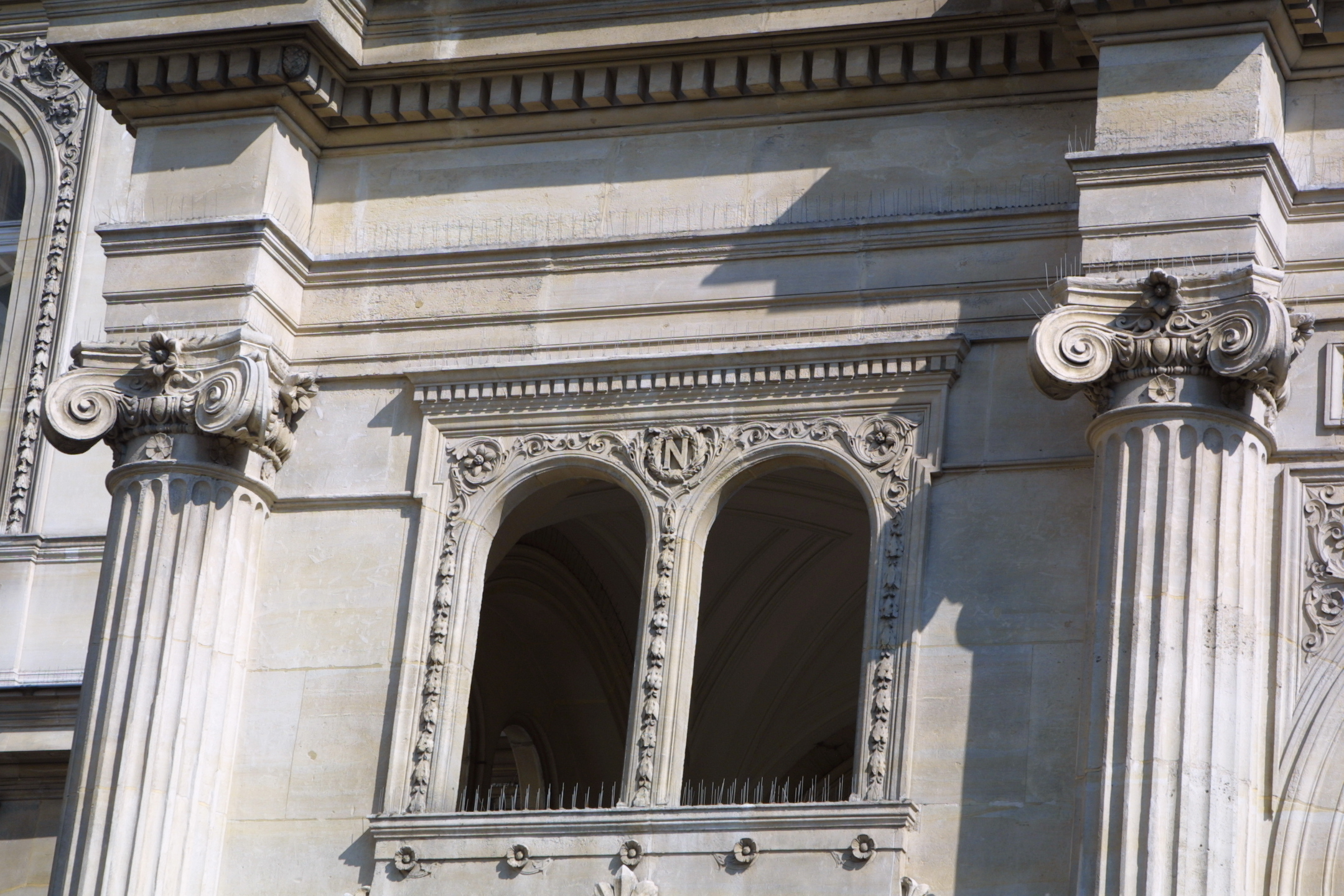
Neoclassical Ionic columns of the Town Hall of the 1st arrondissement of Paris, by Jacques Ignace Hittorff, 1858–1860

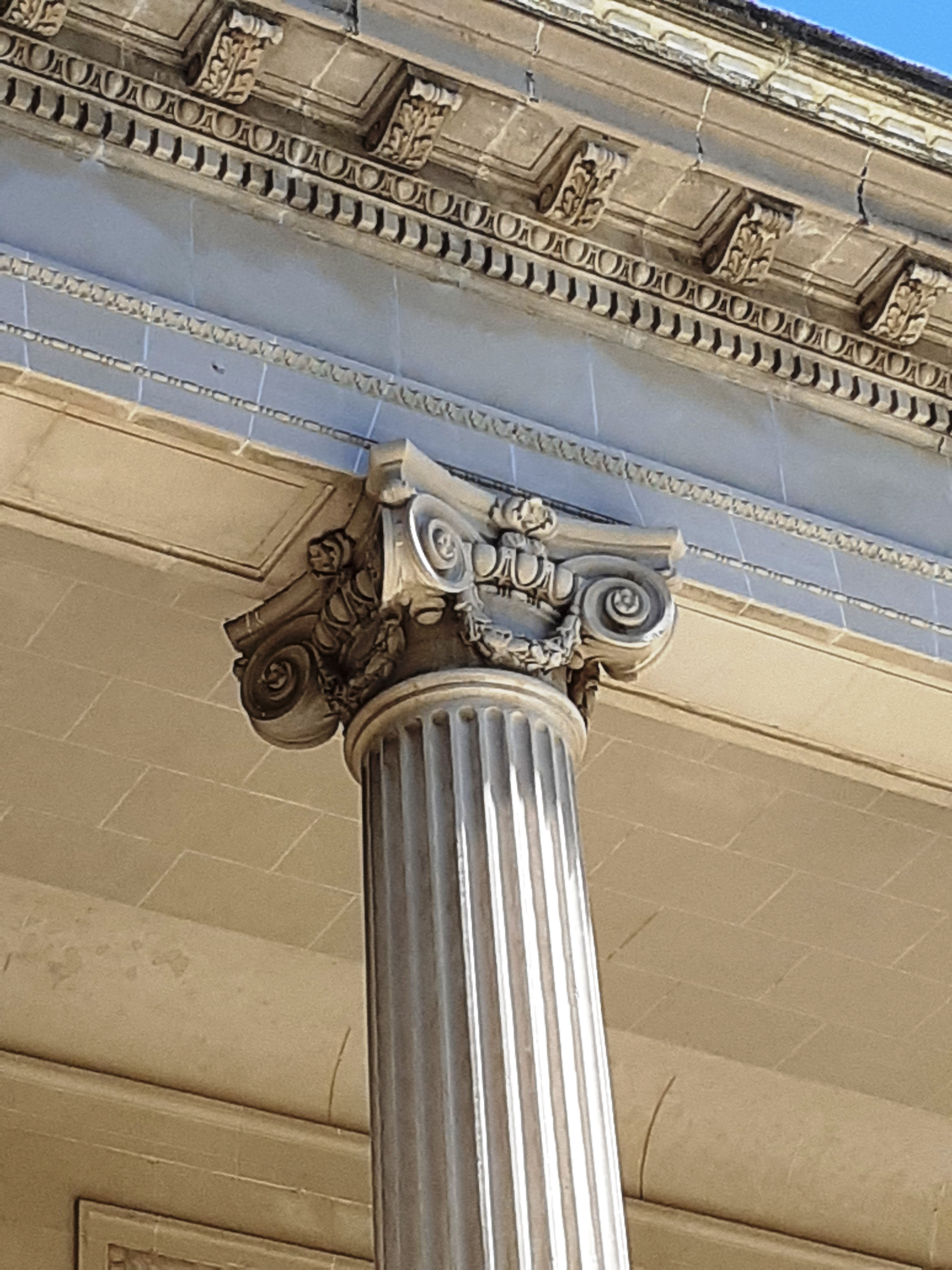
Neoclassical Ionic capital with a festoon between its volutes, part of the entrance portico of the Villa Eilenroc, Antibes, France, by Charles Garnier, 1860–1867

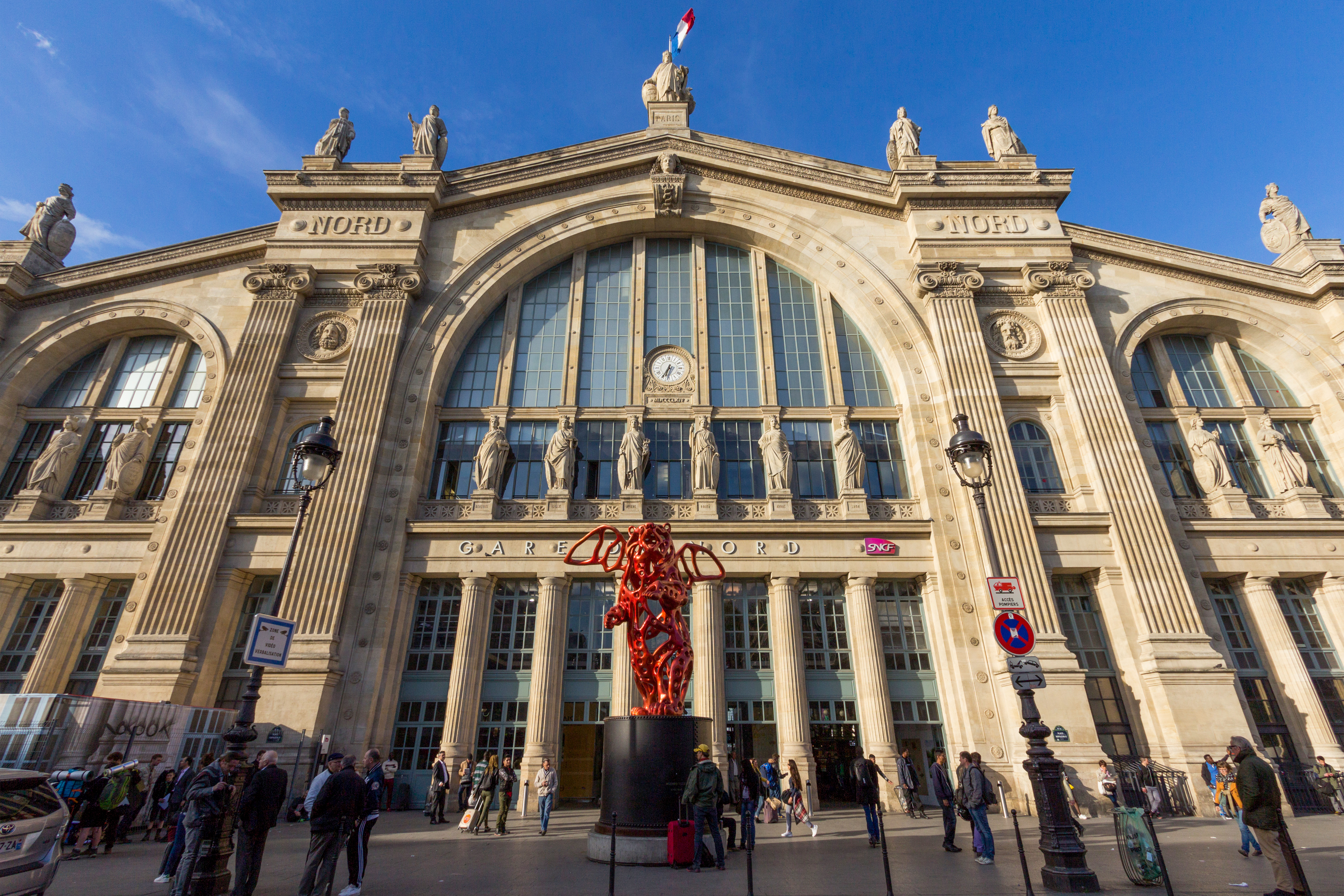
Neoclassical Ionic pilasters on the façade of the Gare du Nord, Paris, by Jacques Ignace Hittorff, 1861–1865

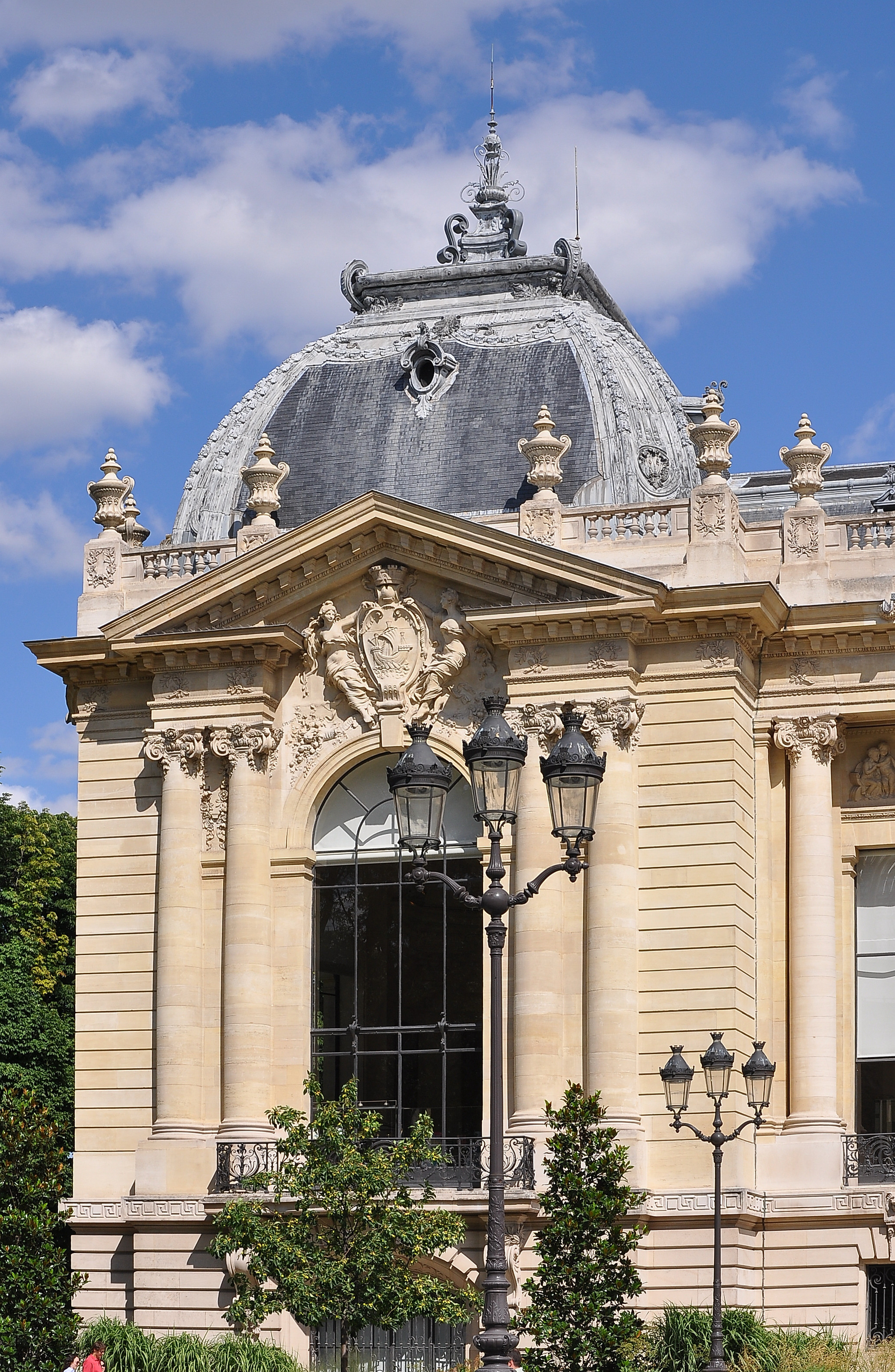
Beaux Arts Ionic columns of the Petit Palais, Paris, by Charles Giraud, 1900

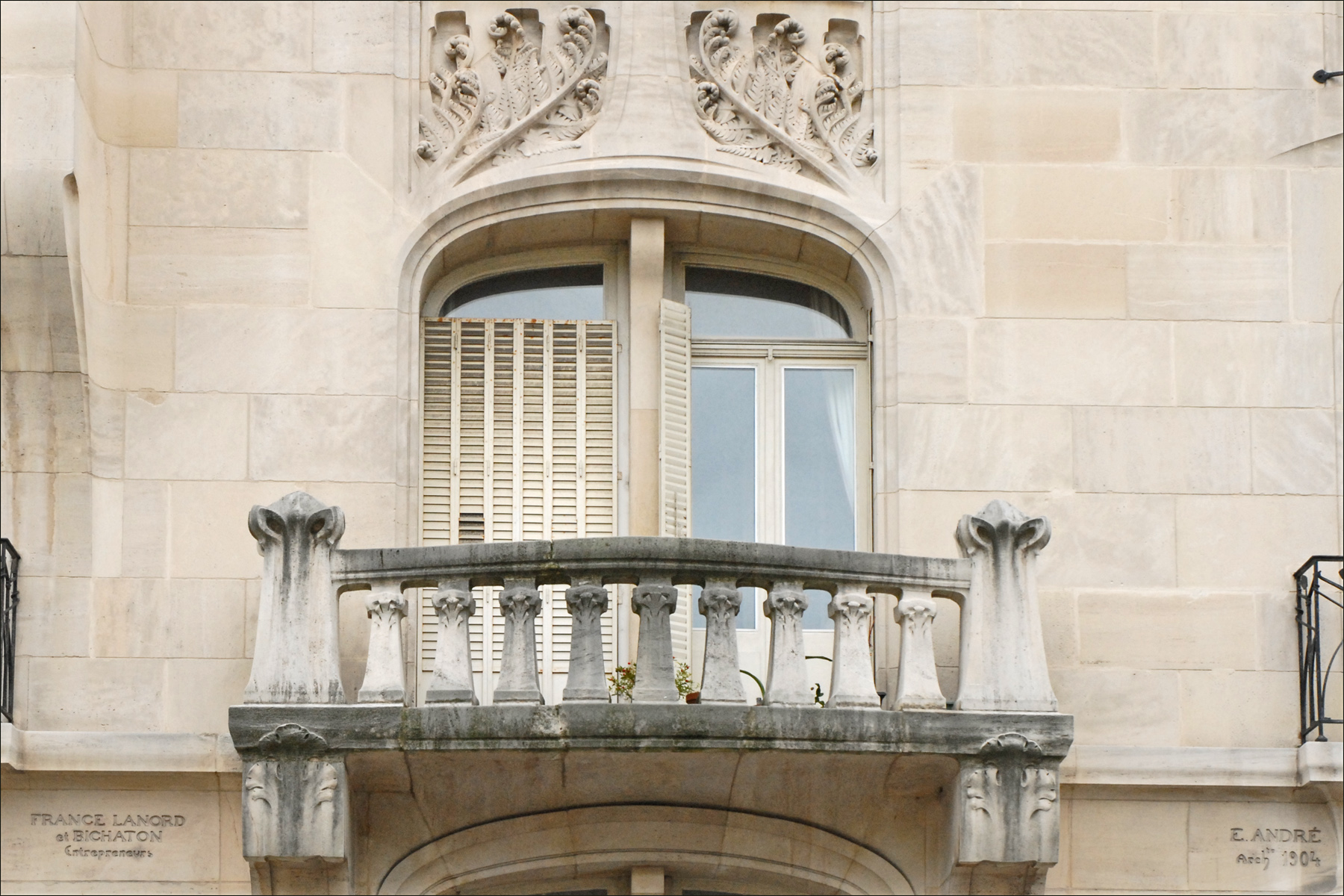
Art Nouveau railing with highly stylized reinterpretations of the Ionic column as balusters, on the France-Lanord Building (Avenue Foch no. 71), Nancy, France, by Émile André, 1904

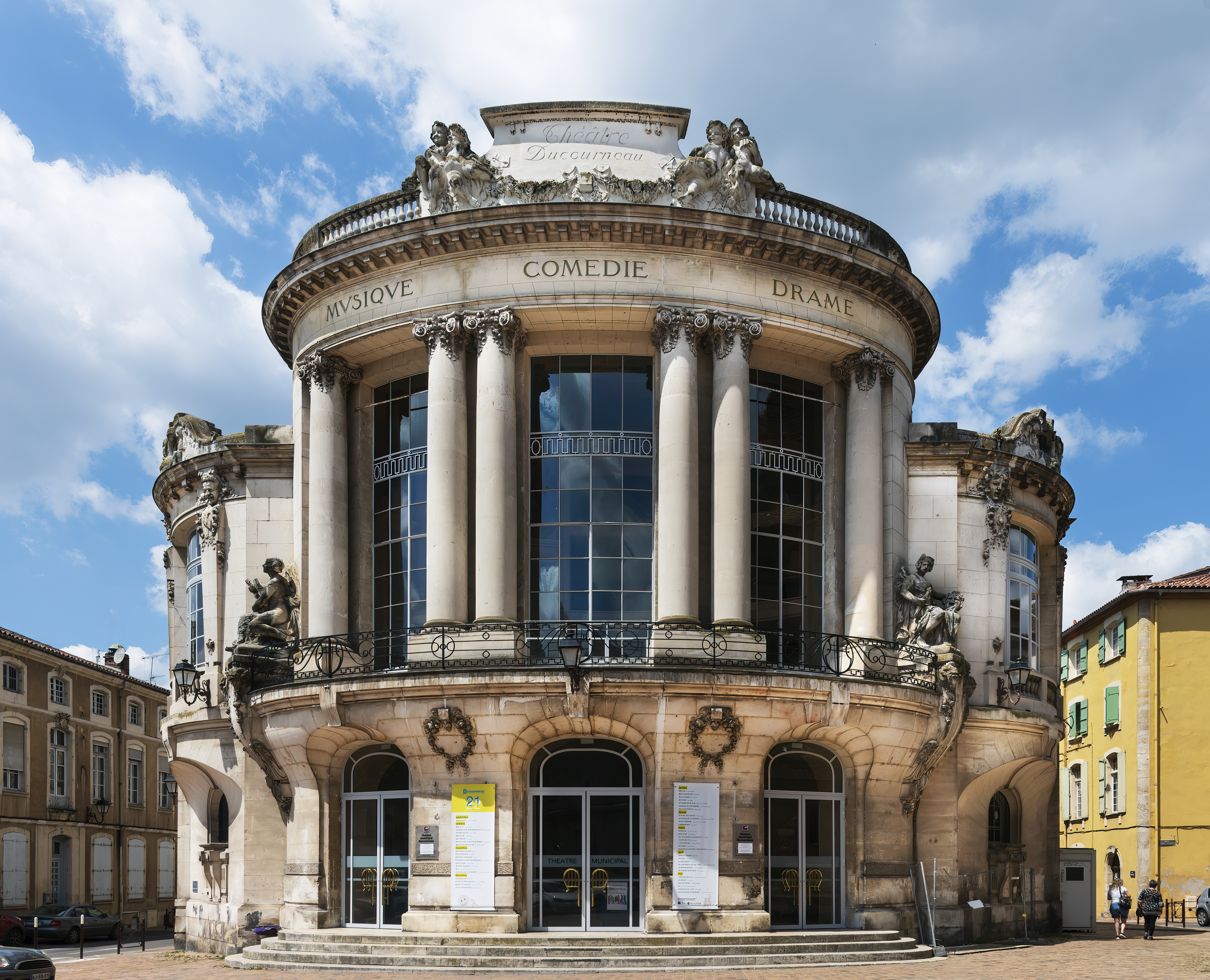
Beaux Arts Ionic columns on the facade of the Ducourneau Theater, Agen, France, by Guillaume Tronchet, 1906–1908

Polychrome Greek Revival Ionic capitals in the Washington Union Station, Washington, D.C., US, by Daniel Burnham, c.1907

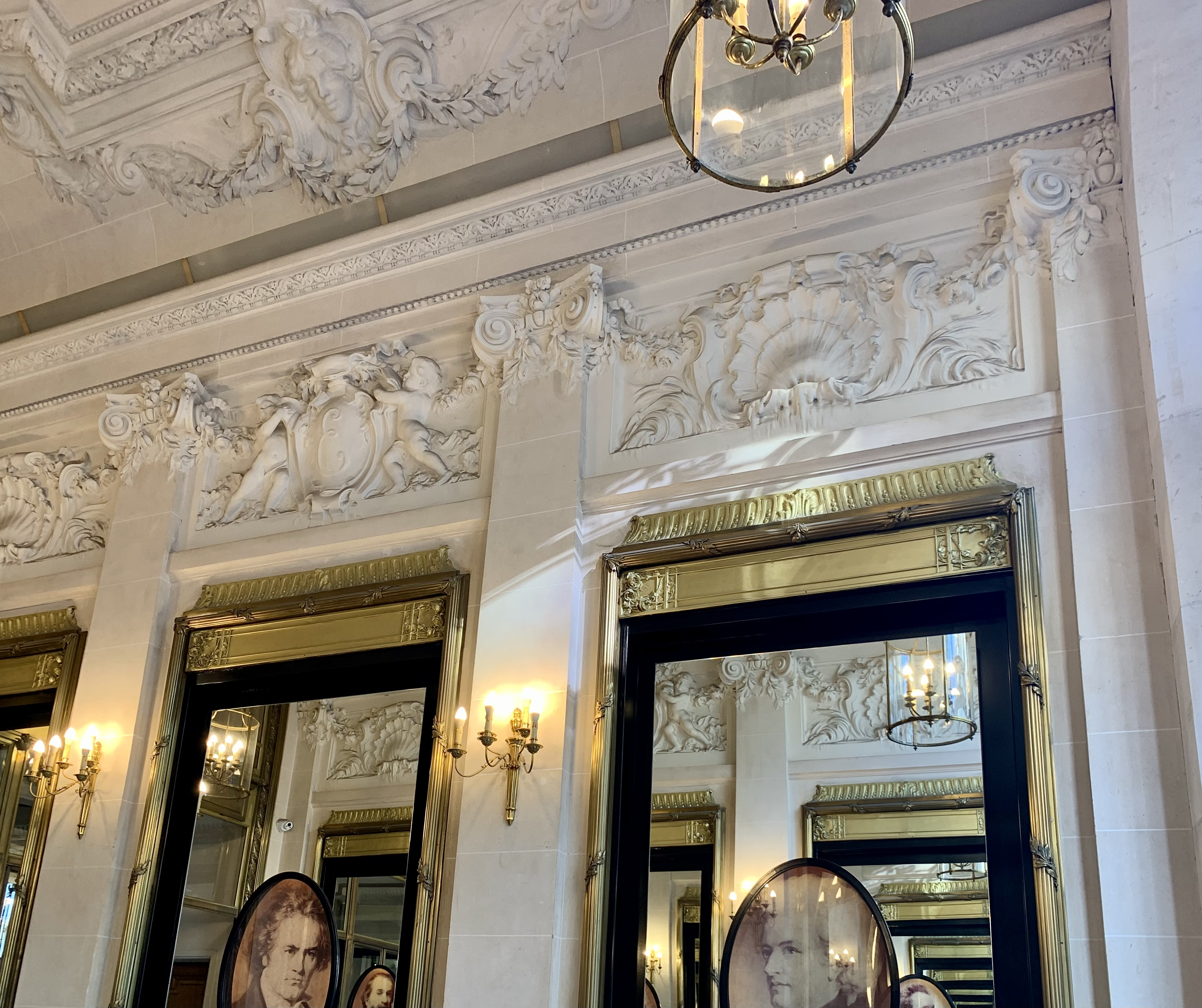
Beaux Arts Ionic pilasters in the entrance hallway of the Rue de la Paix no. 23, Paris, unknown architect, 1908

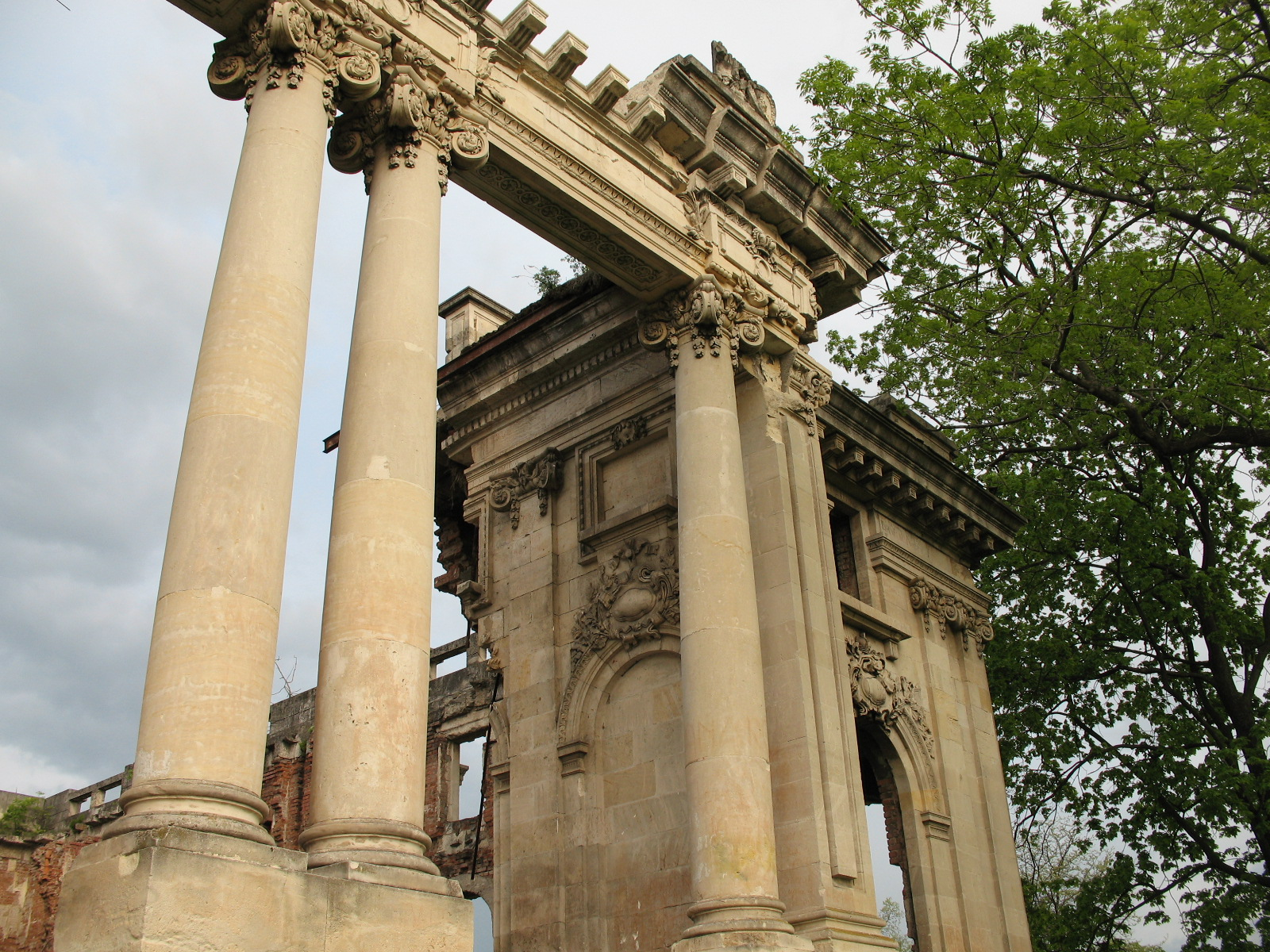
Beaux Arts Ionic columns and pilasters of the Cantacuzino Palace, Florești, Romania, by Ion D. Berindey, 1910–1916

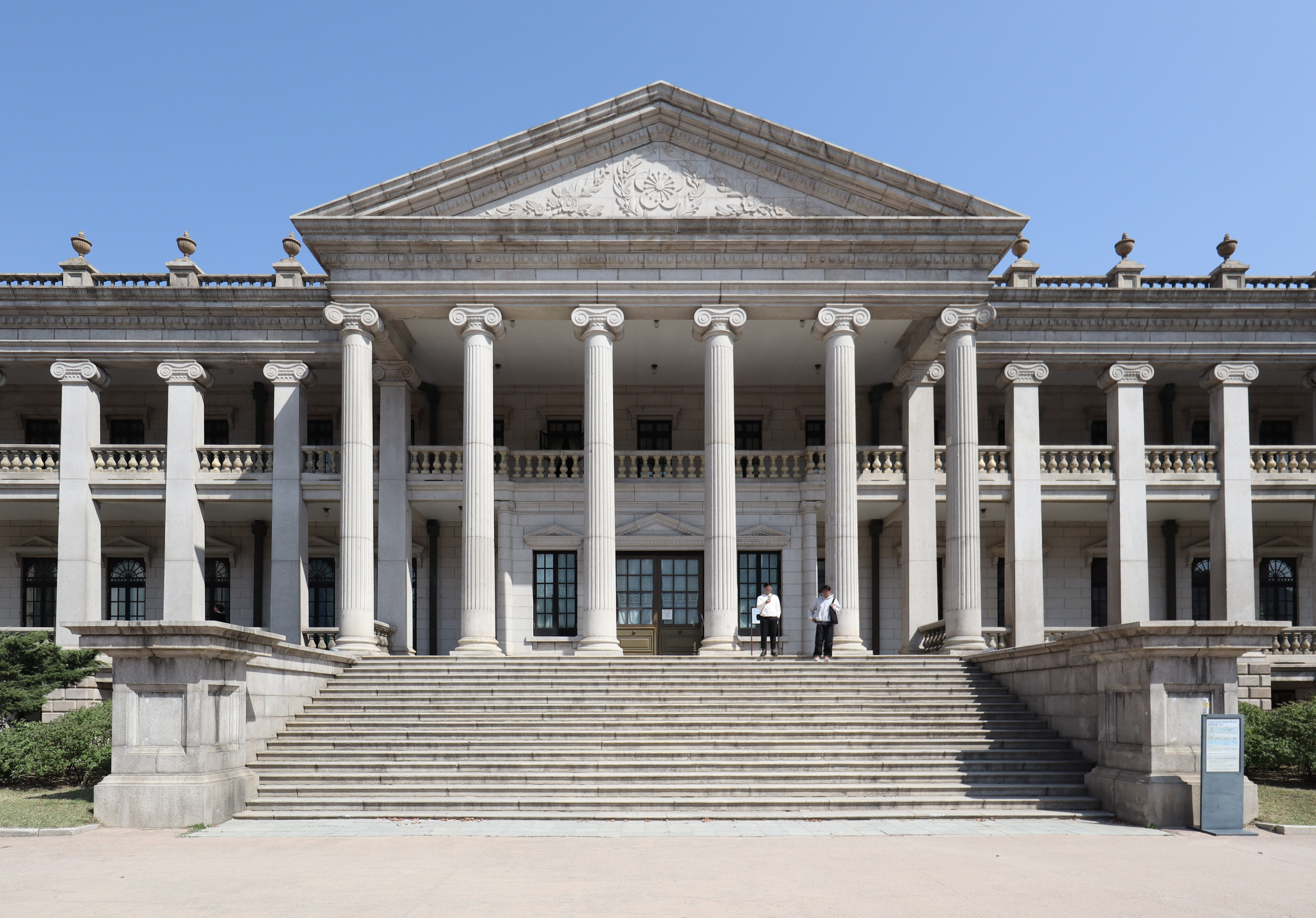
Neoclassical Ionic capitals on the Seokjojeon, Deoksugung Palace, Seoul, South Korea, by John Reginald Harding, 1910

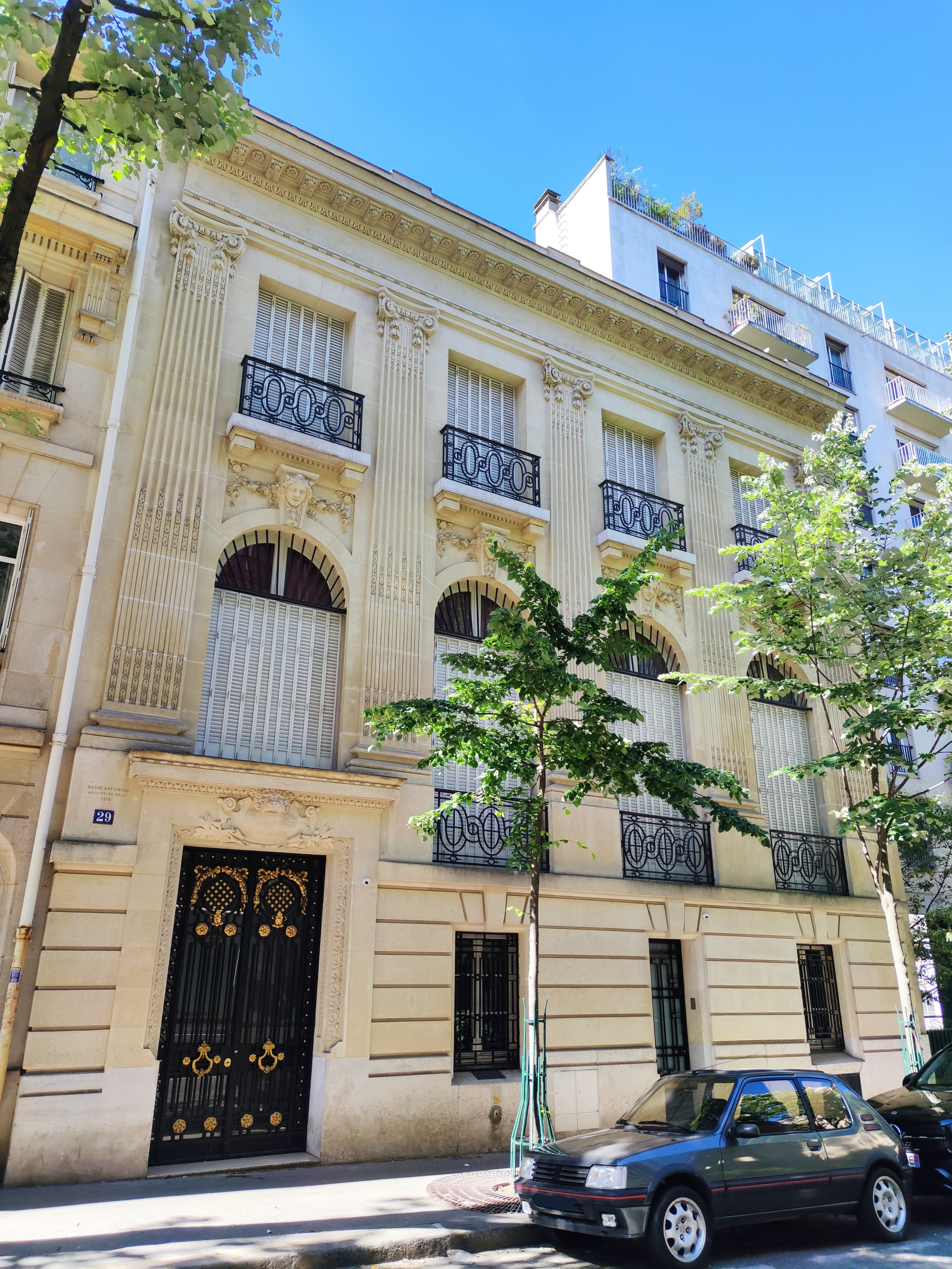
Beaux Arts Ionic pilasters on the facade of the Hôtel Roxoroid de Belfort (Avenue Bugeaud no. 29), Paris, 1911, by André Arfvidson

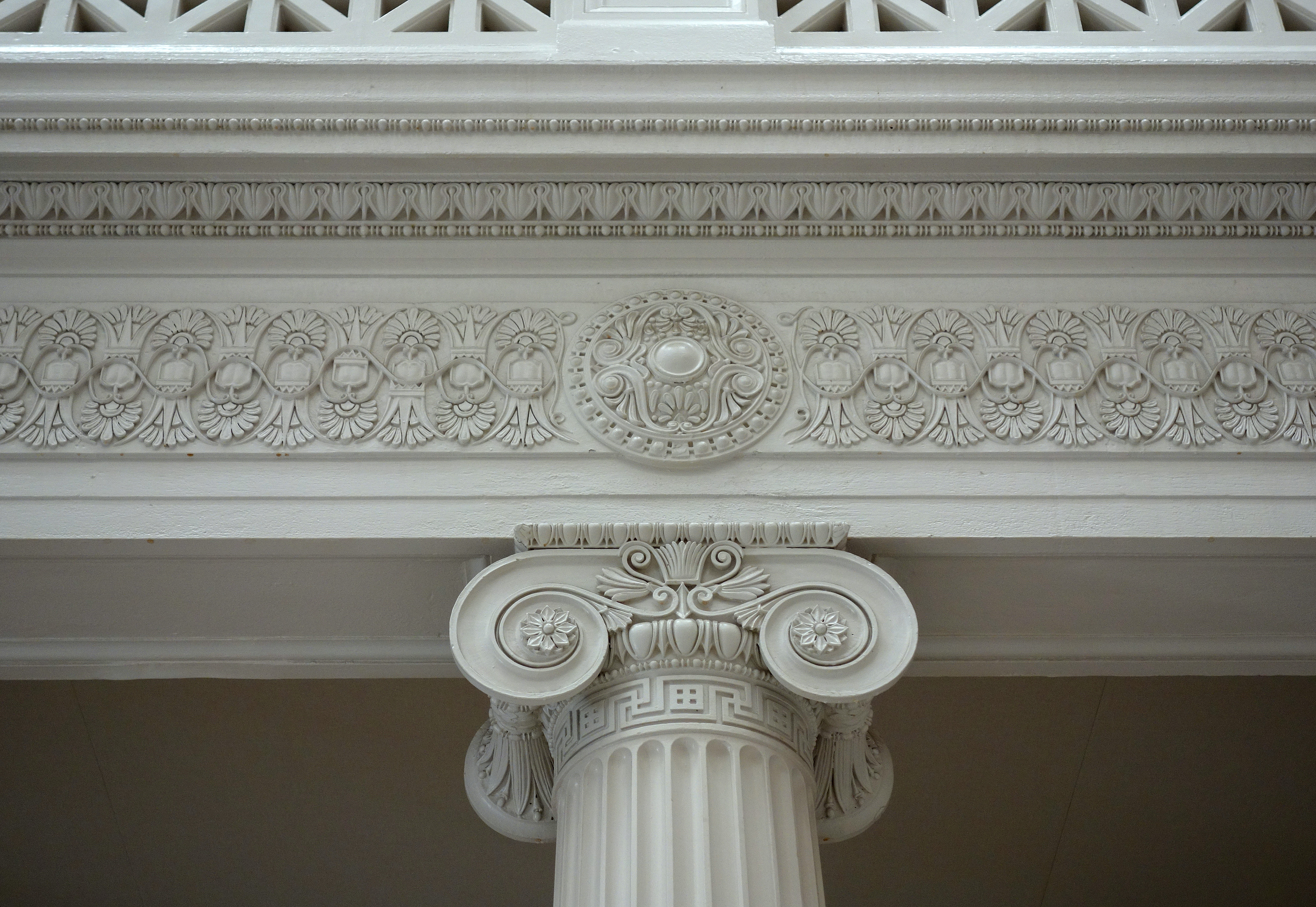
Conspicuous Greek Revival Ionic capital in the New Orleans Museum of Art, New Orleans, US, inspired by those of the Erechtheum in Athens, by Samuel Abraham Marx, 1911

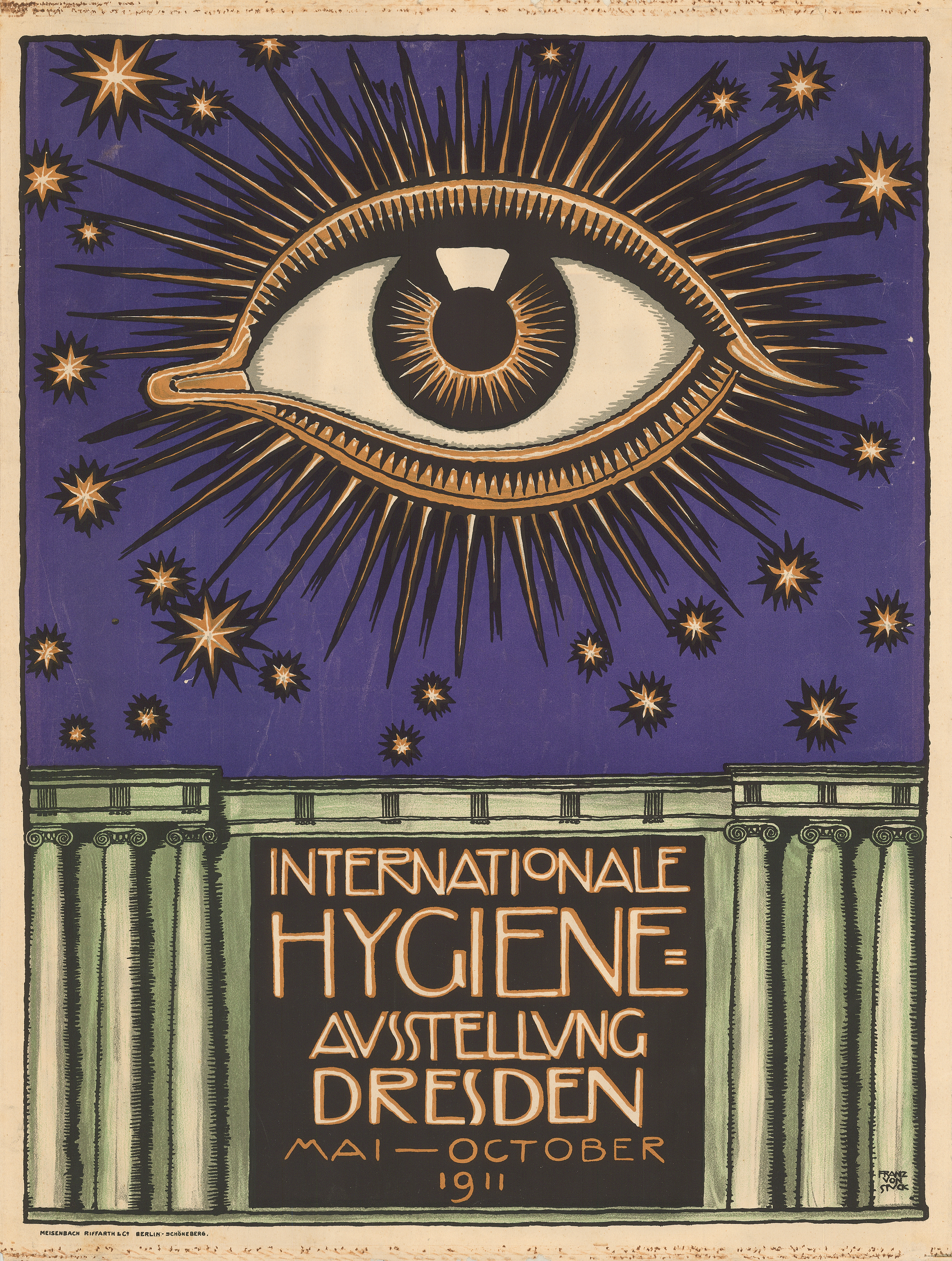
Neoclassical Ionic columns in a Secessionit poster, by Franz Stuck, 1911, lithograph, Poster Collection of the Basel School of Design, Basel, Switzerland

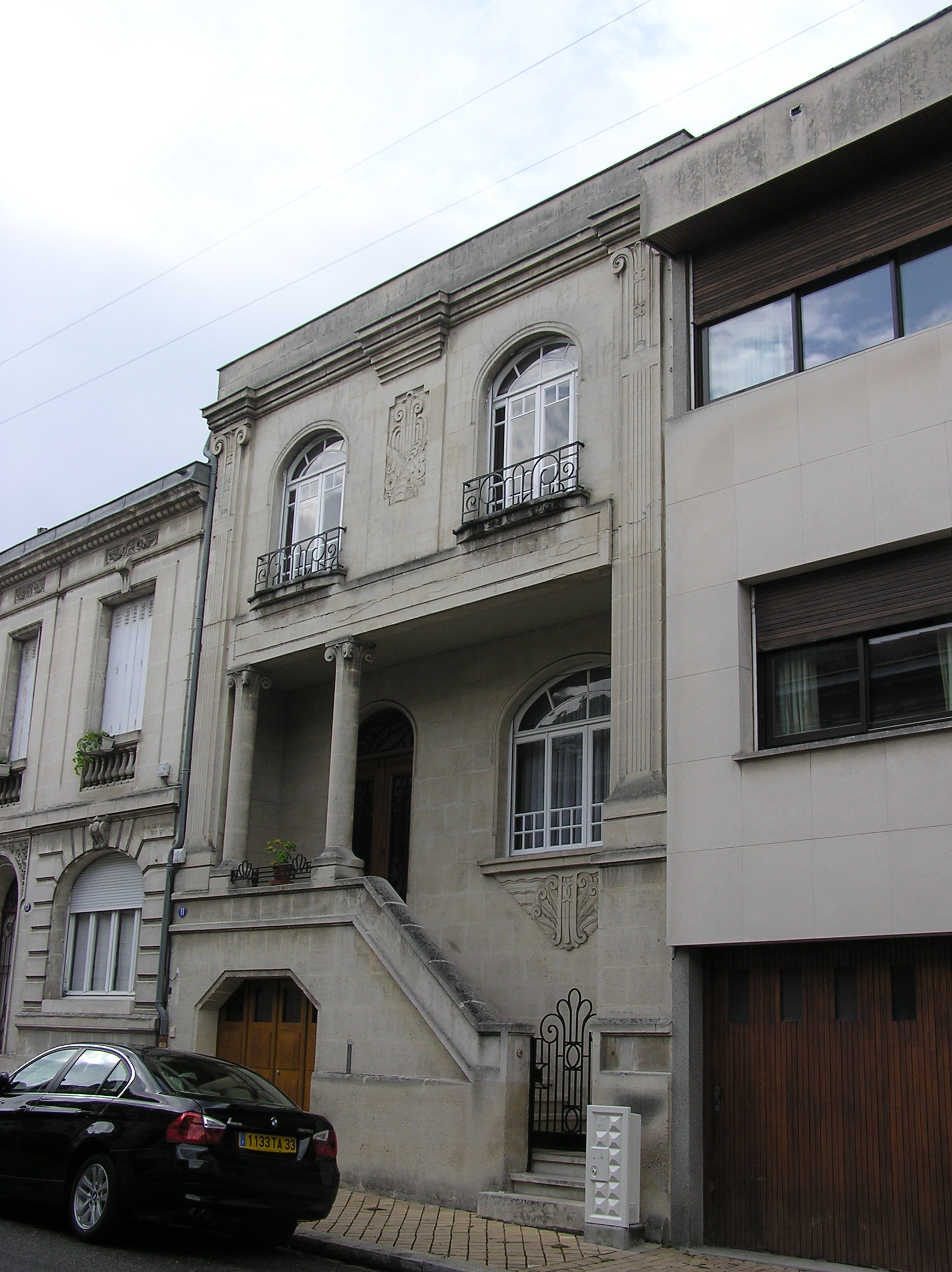
Art Deco reinterpretations of the Ionic column and pilaster of an unidentified house in the Quartier Lescure, Bordeaux, France, unknown architect, c.1925

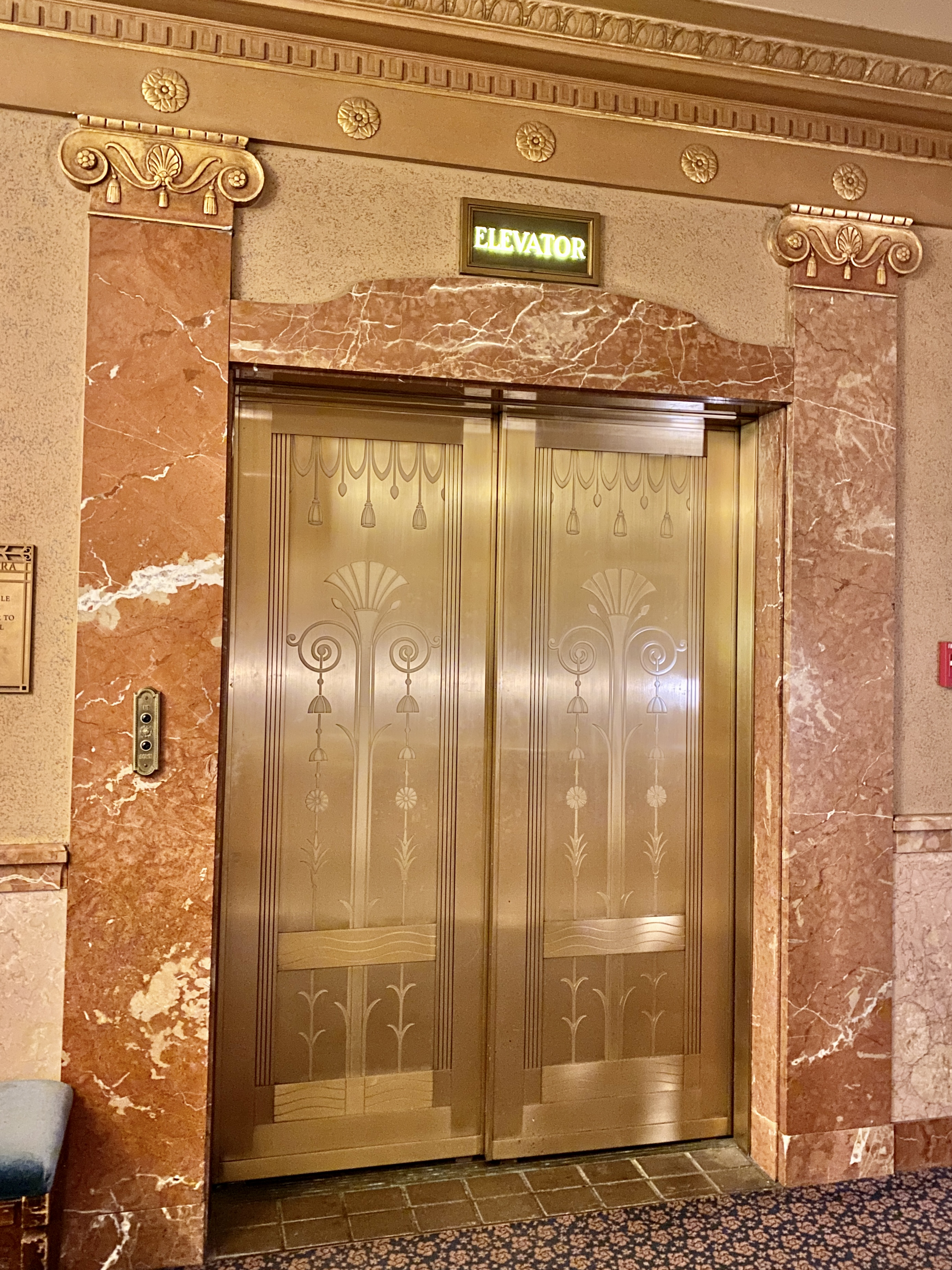
Art Deco and Neoclassical Ionic pilasters in the Severance Hall, Cleveland, US, by Walker and Weeks, 1931

Stalinist Ionic columns of the Colonels' Quarter (Șoseaua Panduri no. 60-62), Bucharest, 1950–1960, by I.Novițchi, C.Ionescu, C.Hacker and A.Șerbescu

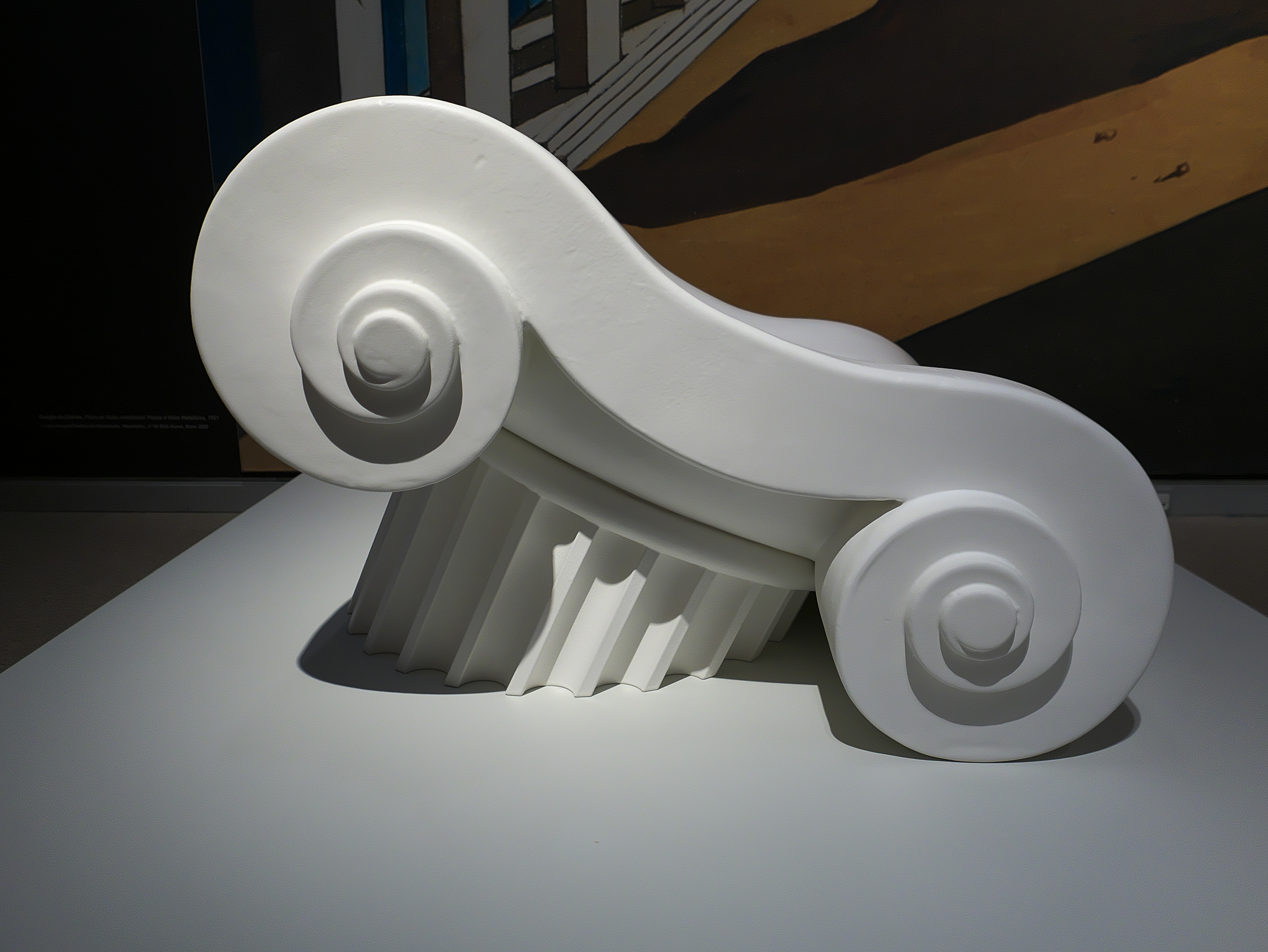
Postmodern reinterpretation of the Ionic column as the Capitello seating, designed by Studio 65 and produced by Gufram, differentiated-density polyurethane foam coated with latex rubber, 1972, unknown location

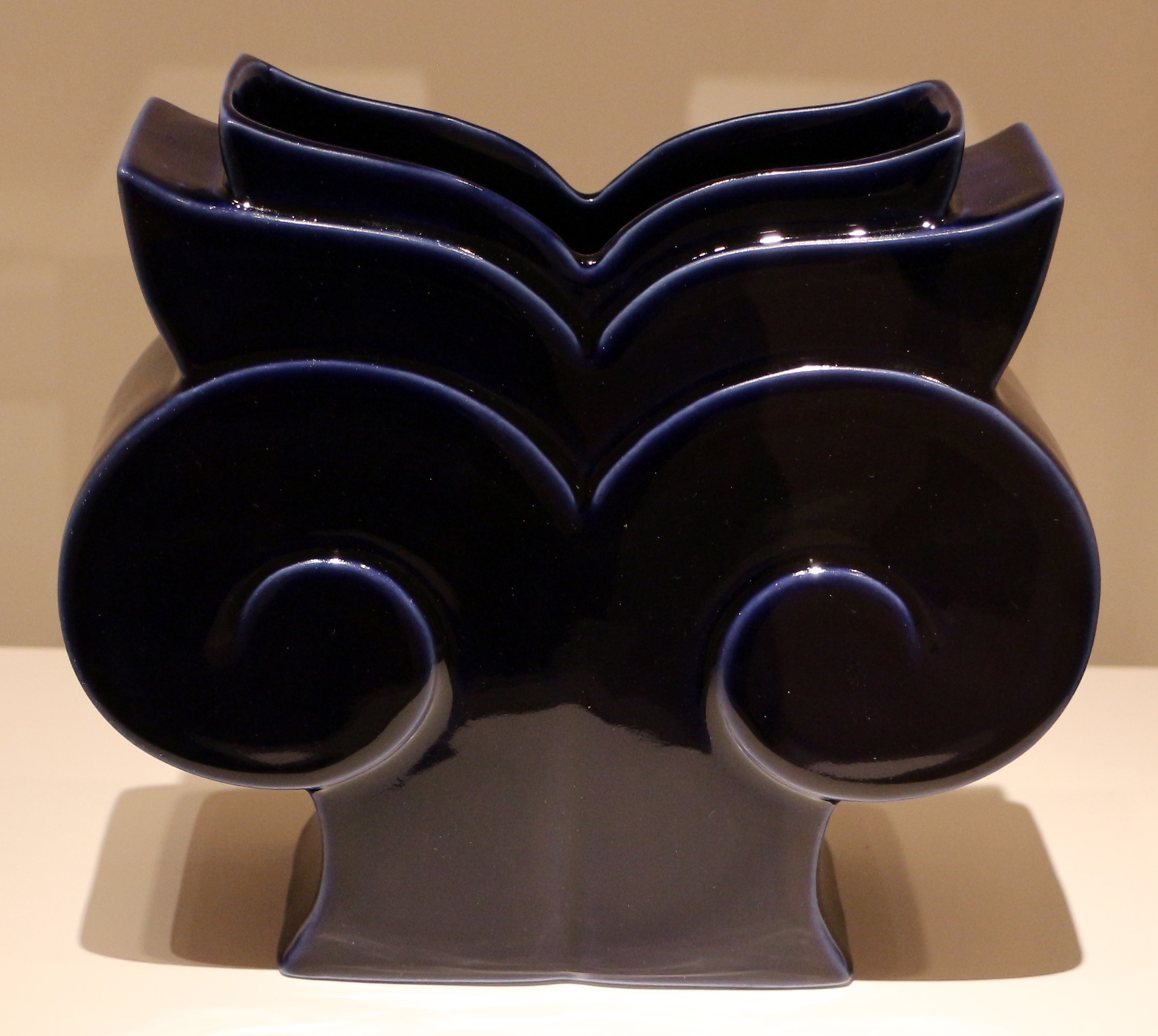
Postmodern vase inspired by the Ionic capital, designed by Michael Graves for Swid Powell, 1989, glazed porcelain, Indianapolis Museum of Art, Indianapolis, US

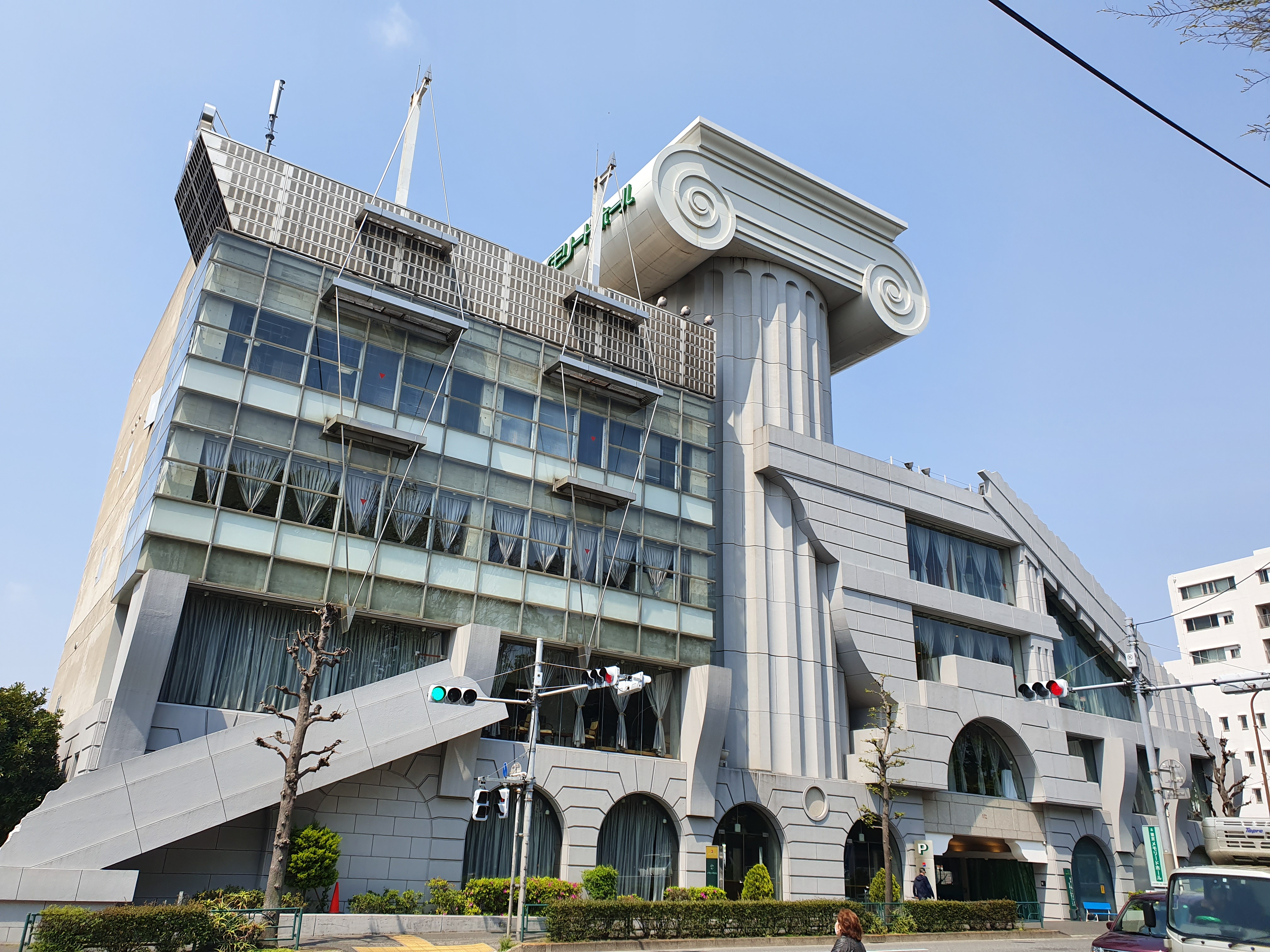
Postmodern Ionic column of the M2 Building, Tokyo, Japan, by Kengo Kuma, 1991

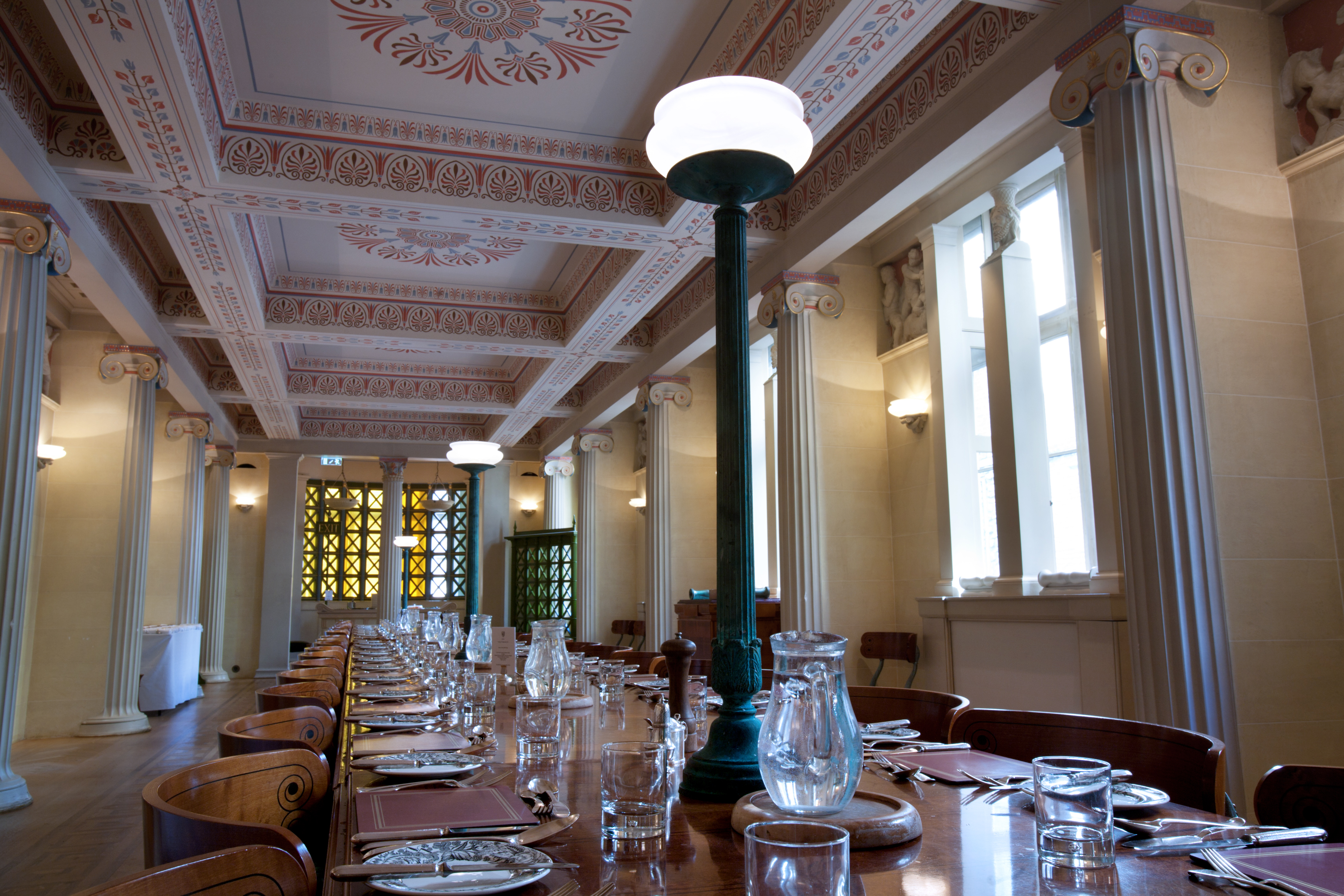
New Classical Greek Revival Ionic columns in the Gonville and Caius College Hall, Cambridge, UK, inspired by those from the Temple of Apollo at Bassaem by John Simpson, 1998

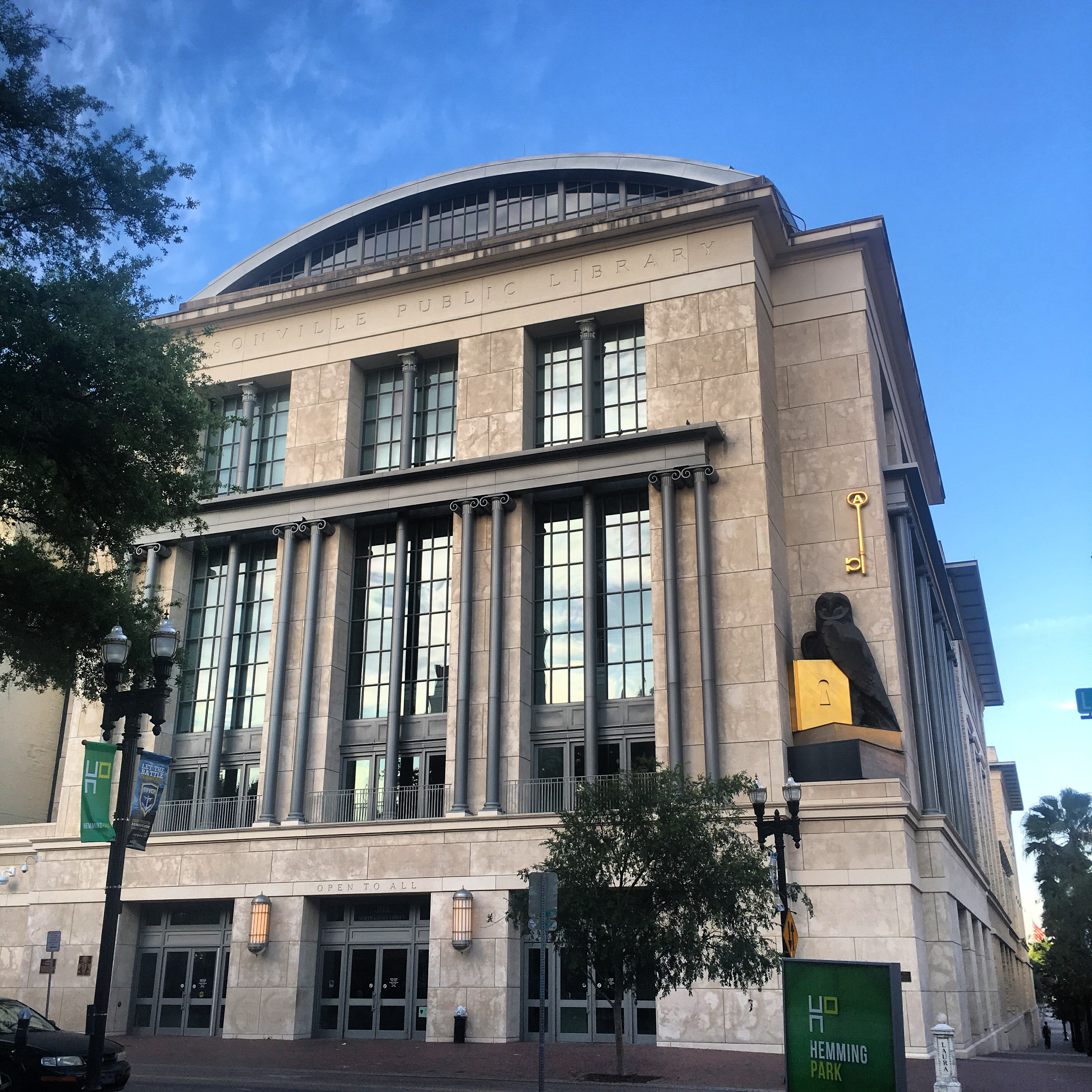
Postmodern reinterpretations of Ionic columns of the Jacksonville Public Library, Jacksonville, US, by Robert A. M. Stern, 2005

== See also ==
- Ancient Greek architecture
- Aeolic order
