= Arbaud =

Arbaud may refer to:

== People with the surname ==
- André-Elzéard d'Arbaud de Jouques (1676-1744), French aristocrat, lawyer and public official.
- André-Elzéard d'Arbaud de Jouques II (1737-1793), French aristocrat, lawyer and public official.
- Azalaïs d'Arbaud (1834-1917), French author.
- Bache-Elzéar-Alexandre d'Arbaud de Jouques (1720-1793), French aristocrat and public official.
- François d'Arbaud de Porchères (1590-1640), French poet.
- Joseph d'Arbaud (1874–1950), French poet.
- Joseph Charles André d'Arbaud de Jouques (1769–1849), French aristocrat, military officer and public official.
- Lamberto Arbaud, Roman Catholic prelate.
- Paul Arbaud (1832-1911), French book collector.

== Location ==
- Hôtel d'Arbaud-Jouques, historic building in France.
