= Bache-Elzéar-Alexandre d'Arbaud de Jouques =

- Born: 1720; Aix-en-Provence, France
- Died: November 27, 1793 (aged 72–73); Aix-en-Provence, France
- Spouse: Françoise-Gabrielle de Bonnet-Costefrède
- Parent(s): André-Elzéard d'Arbaud de Jouques; Anne de Citrany
- Relatives: Jean-Joseph-Augustin d'Arbaud de Jouques (brother); Gaspard d'Arbaud de Jouques (brother); François-Casimir d'Arbaud de Jouques (brother); André-Elzéard d'Arbaud de Jouques II (nephew); Joseph Charles André d'Arbaud de Jouques (great-nephew)

Bache-Elzéar-Alexandre d'Arbaud de Jouques (1720-1793) was a French aristocrat and public official. He served as the governor of Guadeloupe from 1775 to 1782.

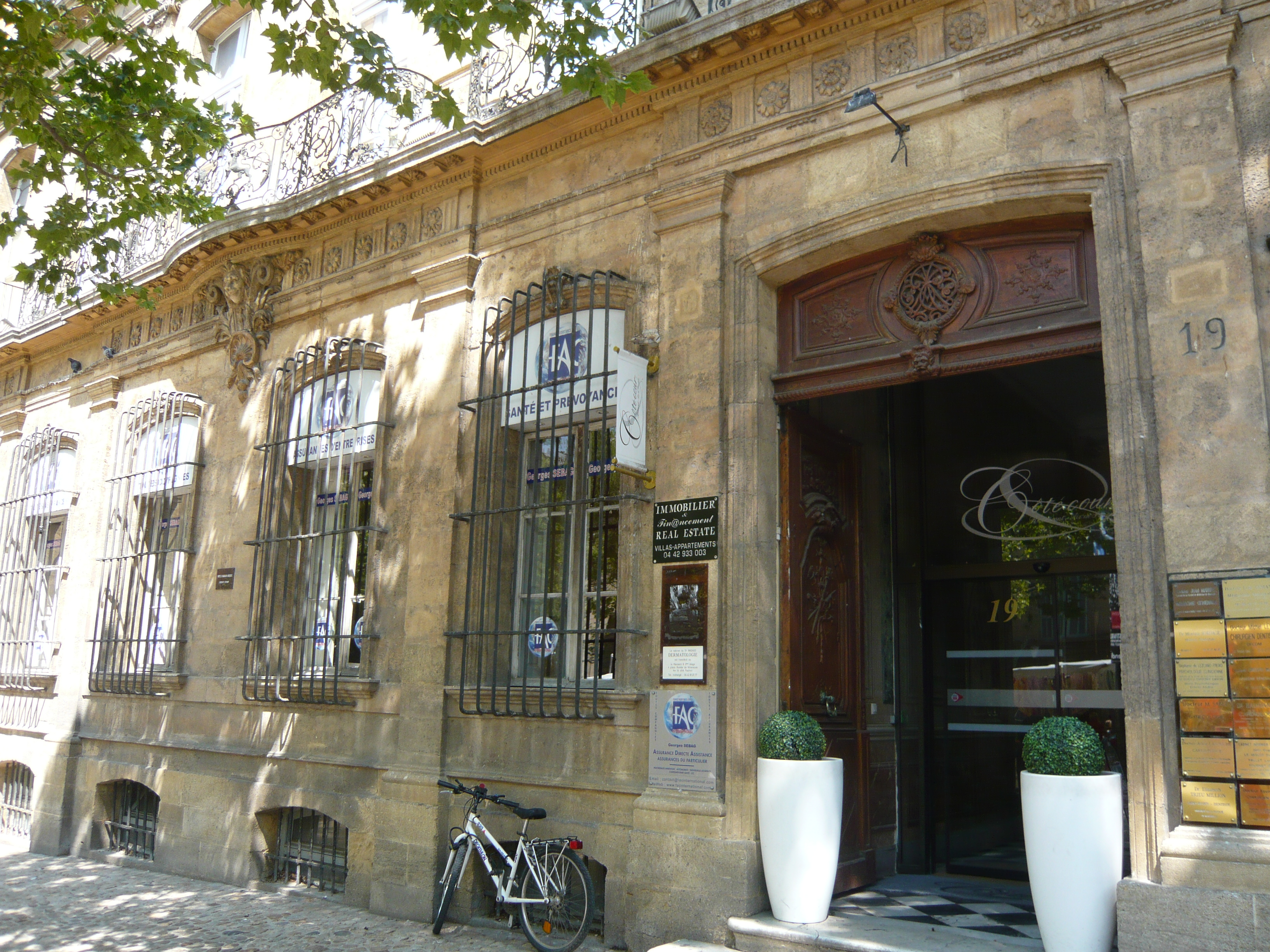
Hôtel d'Arbaud-Jouques in Aix-en-Provence

== Biography ==
=== Early life ===
Bache-Elzéar-Alexandre d'Arbaud de Jouques was born in 1720 in Aix-en-Provence. His father was André-Elzéard d'Arbaud de Jouques (1676-1744) and his mother, Anne de Citrany. He had three brothers: Jean-Joseph-Augustin d'Arbaud de Jouques, Gaspard d'Arbaud de Jouques, and François-Casimir d'Arbaud de Jouques. They grew up in the Hôtel d'Arbaud-Jouques, a hôtel particulier on the Cours Mirabeau in Aix-en-Provence. His nephew, the son of Jean-Joseph-Augustin d'Arbaud de Jouques, was André-Elzéard d'Arbaud de Jouques II (1737-1793). As a result, Joseph Charles André d'Arbaud de Jouques (1769–1849) was his great-nephew.

=== Career ===
He joined the French Navy in 1735, at the age of fifteen. He became an ensign in 1745, Lieutenant in 1754, Captain in 1762, Chef d'escadre in 1778, and Lieutenant general in 1782. He served as Governor of Guadeloupe from 1775 to 1782.

He became Commander in the Order of Saint Louis in 1785 and received 3,000 French livres as a result.

He was jailed in Aix-en-Provence for sedition in 1793, one month before his death.

=== Personal life ===
In 1778, he married his niece Françoise-Gabrielle de Bonnet-Costefrède, widow of Mr de Laugier-Saint-André. They had no children and he had no heirs.

He died on November 26, 1793, in Aix-en-Provence.
