= Marien Leschi =

French soldier and radio pioneer

- Born: June 20, 1903; Venaco, Corsica
- Died: August 2, 1971 (aged 68); Jouques, France
- Military career
- Allegiance: Third Republic of France Vichy France Fourth Republic of France
- Rank: Major General
- Awards: Croix De Guerre Legion of Honnor Medal of The Resistance

Marien Leschi (July 20, 1903 – August 2, 1971) was a soldier, a resistant, a deputy director of French Broadcasting and one of the pioneers of radio and television in France.

== Biography ==
=== Early life and education ===
Born in Venaco, Corsica, on July 20, 1903, Marien Leschi was admitted to the École polytechnique in 1922 and then to the School of Engineering in 1924. He was promoted to lieutenant in 1926 and was assigned to the 18th Engineer Regiment. After a posting in Lebanon from 1928 to 1931, he was promoted to captain and assigned to the Directorate of the equipment of the Military Telegraphy where he served under General Gustave Ferrié.

From 1934 to 1936, he attended the higher school of electricity, then the École supérieure des Postes & Télégraphes, before choosing a military career and being assigned to the "radio-communication services within the territory".

=== The Second World War ===
In 1939, he served in the General Staff's Second Bureau, and was promoted to Battalion Commander in 1940. Assigned to communications, he participated in negotiating an agreement with Poland regarding wavelengths. He subsequently commanded a communications team seconded to Leopold III in Belgium. During the Battle of France—specifically from May 10 to May 27, 1940—he successfully maintained an uninterrupted link between the Cabinet of the King of the Belgians and the French General Headquarters, located at La Ferté-sous-Jouarre and the Château de Vincennes. This link went through Calais, then to England via submarine cables, the Channel Islands, Cherbourg, and Paris.

Following the armistice of June 1940, he was assigned to the radio-communications center of the Armistice Army, located at "La Ferme de la Rapine" near Vichy. The Germans had authorized its existence as part of the peacekeeping mission granted to the remnants of the French Army under the Vichy regime. A significant portion of the equipment from Paris which should have been handed over to the occupiers was maintained by this team, which subsequently dispatched radio equipment to various locations across mainland France and North Africa. This team also intercepted German communications within occupied territory. Although theoretically under the authority of the PTT (Postal, Telegraph, and Telephone Administration), this service was, in practice, placed under the direct command of the French General Staff and its chief, General Verneau.

It was a service led by military officers—driven by strong anti-German sentiments—who had shed their uniforms and concealed their ranks. In October and early November 1942, the intercepts gathered at La Rapine enabled the tracking of German troop concentrations near the Demarcation Line, thereby confirming the imminent invasion of the Free Zone—an invasion that other sources predicted would commence at midnight on November 10. On the night of November 9–10, the commanders of the Armistice Army—gathered around General Verneau—proceeded to La Ferme de la Rapine, where they awaited orders to mount a resistance. However, General Bridoux, the Vichy regime's Secretary of State for War, issued a counter-order, instructing them instead to disperse

On November 10, 1942, at 7:00 am, German forces advanced into the Free Zone during Operation Anton and took control of it without encountering any real opposition. The Rapine radio center remained operational until July 8, 1943, and during this period, Leschi attempted to place his team under the authority of the National Gendarmerie, concealed their equipment, and forged ties with the Army Resistance Organization (ORA). On July 8, 1943—evidently acting on intelligence—the Gestapo raided Rapine. According to Hugo Geissler, a SS captain who led the operation, Leschi's team had trained several hundred individuals in radio communication techniques and established a network of 40 radio stations, some of which were equipped with their own power generators. Arrested alongside five members of his team for clandestine activities in support of the Resistance, Battalion Commander Leschi was deported to the Mittlebau-Dora concentration camp. He survived and was repatriated in 1945.

=== Radio and Television career ===
In 1946, Leschi was promoted to colonel and assigned to the Territorial Communications Operations Service. Appointed Director of Technical Services for French Broadcasting in 1947 by Wladimir Porché, he held this position until his retirement. He was promoted to Brigadier General in 1950 and Major General in 1956, continuing to climb the ranks of the military hierarchy despite his assignment to an administration that was—while undoubtedly sensitive—fundamentally civilian. On June 4, 1954, during a press conference, he announced the launch of the Eurovision exchange network. Exercising caution, he emphasized the experimental nature of this European network and asked viewers for "great indulgence, as technical glitches are bound to occur". In 1958, at his own request, he was transferred to the reserve corps. In 1959, he became deputy director of the Radiodiffusion-télévision française (R.T.F.). He retired in April 1963.

General Leschi was one of the pioneers of French radio and television. He laid the foundations for a project that would eventually lead to the construction of the Maison de la Radio (House of Radio). He strengthened the network of transmitters. He worked to accelerate the modernization of technical equipment. He oversaw the establishment of frequency modulation (FM) radio networks—a technology he had championed from an early stage. He also directed the preparatory studies for the launch of France's second television channel.

He was a Grand Officer of the Legion of Honour and a recipient of the 1939–1945 Croix de Guerre and the Medal of the Resistance.

He died in Jouques, in the Bouches-du-Rhône, on August 2, 1971.
