= Paul Arbaud =

French book collector and philanthropist

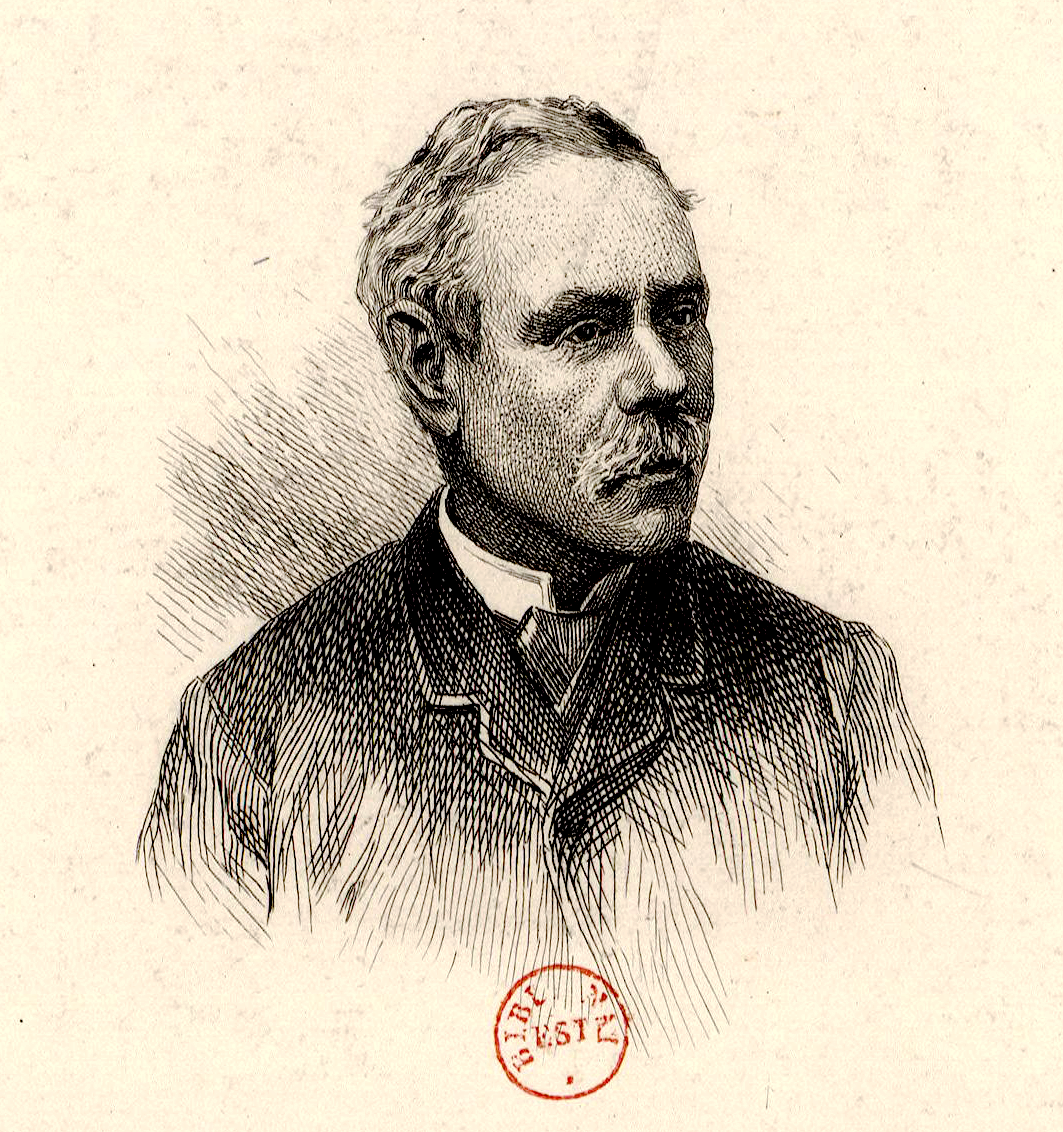
- Paul Arbaud, engraving circa 1900
- Born: 27 March 1832; Paris, France
- Died: 17 March 1911 (aged 78); Aix-en-Provence, France
- Occupation(s): Book collector, philanthropist
- Parent(s): Edouard Arbaud; Stéphanie Pasquier de Coulans
- Relatives: Jules Pasquier (maternal grandfather); Étienne-Denis Pasquier (maternal grand-uncle)

Paul Arbaud (1832-1911) was a French book collector and philanthropist.

== Early life ==
Paul Arbaud was born on 27 March 1832. His father, Edouard Arbaud, originally from Manosque, worked as a judge in Paris. His mother, Stéphanie Pasquier de Coulans, was the daughter of Jules-Paul Pasquier, the owner of the Château de Coulans and a Conseiller d'Etat, and the niece of Étienne-Denis Pasquier.

== Collection ==
Arbaud joined the Académie d'Aix-en-Provence in 1883. He moved into a hôtel particulier on the rue du Quatre-Septembre in the Quartier Mazarin of Aix-en-Provence in 1884. He started a collection of plates, paintings and old books. He acquired the original copy of L'Histoire de s. Louis by historian Louis Antoine de Ruffi from Albert de Tollon in 1892. He eventually acquired about 1,600 old books.

Arbaud donated his collection to the Académie d'Aix-en-Provence on 10 October 1910.

== Personal life, death and legacy ==
Arbaud married Adrienne de Robineau Valmont.

Arbaud died on 17 March 1911 in Aix-en-Provence. His hôtel particulier became known as the Musée Arbaud, home to his collection.
