= Azalaïs d'Arbaud =

French writer

- Born: Marie-Azalaïs Valère-Martin; 1834
- Died: 1917 (aged 82–83)
- Citizenship: France
- Occupation: Writer
- Children: Joseph d'Arbaud; Berthe d'Arbaud
- Writing career
- Language: Occitan

Azalaïs d'Arbaud (née Marie-Azalaïs Valère-Martin; 1834–1917) was a French writer in the Occitan language. Daughter of V. Martin, she lived in Meyrargues, Bouches-du-Rhône. She worked at Amarna Prouvençau, and in 1860 wrote Madaleno e lou tavan Rous (the first poem written by a woman and included in the Amarna since its creation in 1855). La Dourgueto followed in 1862. In 1888, she was awarded the first prize at the Jeux Floraux at Digne for l'Anello d'or. Arbaud was the wife of Count Felix Arbaud; she was the mother of the poet Joseph d'Arbaud and a daughter, Berthe.

== Biography ==
Azalaïs d'Arbaud née Marie-Louise Valère-Martin, la Felibresso dou Couloun, lived in Meyrargues (Bouches-du-Rhône). Wife of Philippe d'Arbaud, she was the mother of Joseph d'Arbaud and a daughter named Berthe. She contributed to the Armana Prouvençau, in 1860 with Madaleno e lou tavan rous, (the first poem written by a woman to appear in the Armana since its creation in 1855) La Dourgueto in 1862. In 1886 Elegio sus la mort de ma tourtouro was awarded a prize at the Jeux Floraux d'Aix-en-Provence; in 1888 it was awarded first prize at the Jeux Floraux de Digne-les-Bains for the Anello d'or. Elegio sus la mort de ma tourtouro was awarded first prize at the Floralia Aix-en-Provence for the Anello d'or.

== Selected works ==
- Madaleno e lou tavan
- La Dourgueto
- Lis amouro de ribas (1863)
