= Joseph Charles André d'Arbaud de Jouques =

- Born: 1769
- Died: 1849 (aged 79–80)
- Occupation: Public official
- Spouse: Joséphine Marie Charlotte (de Rafélis) d'Arbaud de Jouques
- Children: Jean Philippe Joseph André d'Arbaud de Jouques; Augustine Marie Alexandrine Elisabeth d'Arbaud de Jouques; Caroline Elzéarine Alexandrine d'Arbaud de Jouques
- Parent(s): André-Elzéard d'Arbaud de Jouques; Gabrielle Thérèse de Milan-Forbin

Joseph Charles André, baron d'Arbaud de Jouques, dit marquis d'Arbaud-Jouques (1769–1849) was a French aristocrat, military officer and public official.

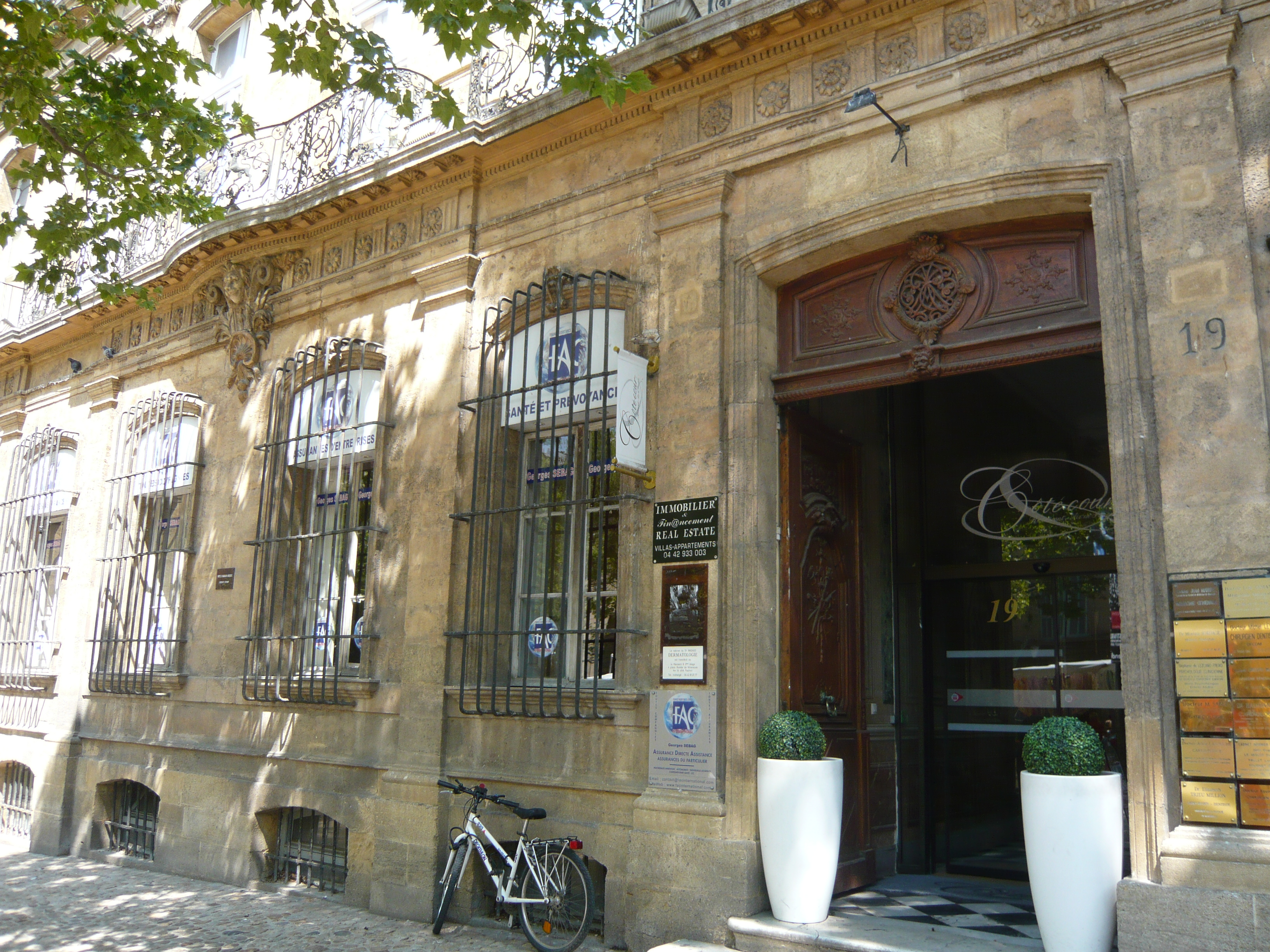
Hôtel d'Arbaud-Jouques

== Early life ==
Joseph Charles André d'Arbaud de Jouques was born on 11 May 1769 in Aix-en-Provence. His father, André-Elzéard d'Arbaud de Jouques II (1737-1793), inherited the marquisates of Jouques and Mison and served as the Président à mortier in the Parlement of Aix-en-Provence. His mother was Gabrielle Thérèse de Milan-Forbin. He grew up in the Hôtel d'Arbaud-Jouques located at 19 on the Cours Mirabeau, listed as monument historique since 1990.

== Career ==
D'Arbaud de Jouques joined the Knights Hospitaller in February 1791. Opposed to the French Revolution of 1789, he served in the Army of Condé to overthrow the French Directory and, after the 18 Brumaire of 1799, he received the Cross of the Order of Saint Louis and the Knighthood of the Legion of Honour from Napoleon. He also became a Baron of the First French Empire.

D'Arbaud de Jouques was close to Joseph Fouché (1759–1820), who encouraged him to accept public offices.

D'Arbaud de Jouques served as under-Prefet of Aix-en-Provence from 1806 to 1813, following by Prefect of Hautes-Pyrénées from 1813 to 1814, Prefect of Charente-Maritime from 1814 to 1815, Prefect of the Gard from 1815 to 1817, Prefect of the Côte-d'Or from 1823 to 1829, and Prefect of the Bouches-du-Rhône from 1829 to 1830. He also served as a Conseiller d'Etat.

D'Arbaud de Jouques became a member of the Académie des belles-lettres, sciences et arts de La Rochelle in 1814.

== Personal life and death ==
D'Arbaud de Jouques married Joséphine Marie Charlotte de Rafélis, daughter of Joseph-Marie de Rafélis (1714–1774). They had one son and two daughters:

- Jean Philippe Joseph André d'Arbaud de Jouques (1804-unknown).
- Augustine Marie Alexandrine Elisabeth d'Arbaud de Jouques. She married Oswald d'Arnaud, son of Eugène François d'Arnauld (1774–1854).
- Caroline Elzéarine Alexandrine d'Arbaud de Jouques (1808–1869). She married Armand Sabatier (1804–1873).

He died on 5 June 1849 in Aix-en-Provence.

== Bibliography ==
- Joseph Charles André d'Arbaud de Jouques, Troubles et agitations du département du Gard en 1815. Contenant le rapport du révérend Perrot, au Comité des ministres non-conformistes d'Angleterre, sur la prétendue persécution des protestans en France, et sa réfutation, 167 pages.
