= First Restoration =

French government (1814–1815)

Kingdom of France Royaume de France
- 1814–1815
- Flag Coat of arms
- Motto: Montjoie Saint Denis! "Montjoy Saint Denis!"
- Anthem: Le Retour des Princes français à Paris "The Return of the French Princes to Paris"
- The Kingdom of France in 1814
- Capital: Paris
- Common languages: French
- Religion: Roman Catholicism
- Government: Constitutional monarchy
- King
  - 1814–1815: Louis XVIII
- Presidents of the Council of Ministers
  - 1814: Charles de Bénévent
  - 1814–1815: de Blacas
- Legislature: Parliament
  - Upper house: Chamber of Peers
  - Lower house: Chamber of Deputies
- History
  - Restoration: 6 April 1814
  - Treaty of Paris: 30 May 1814
  - Constitution adopted: 4 June 1814
  - Hundred Days: 20 March – 7 July 1815
  - Disestablished: 20 March 1815
- Currency: French franc
- ISO 3166 code: FR
Preceded by	Succeeded by
First French Empire	First French Empire

The First Restoration was a period in French history that saw the return of the House of Bourbon to the throne, between the abdication of Napoleon in the spring of 1814 and the Hundred Days in March 1815. The regime was born following the victory of the Sixth Coalition (United Kingdom, Russia, Prussia, Sweden, and Austria) as part of the campaign of France, while the country was in conflict during the First French Empire. The Allied powers were divided over the person to be placed on the throne of France. The Bourbons in exile, the French institutions, and the foreign powers disputed on the matter. After the abdication of Napoleon on 6 April, the throne went to Louis XVIII, brother of Louis XVI, who returned to Paris at the end of the month and moved to the Tuileries Palace.

As opposed to the pre-Napoleonic Ancien Régime, the new regime was a constitutional monarchy. This was a compromise position the sovereign granted the French through the Charter of 1814. This allowed for the return of the monarchy while preserving some of the major achievements, such as those regarding suffrage and property rights, gained through the French Revolution. During its short existence, the regime focused on attempting to reconcile the country. This method disappointed the most extreme monarchists, who hoped for vengeance for the slights suffered during the revolutionary period, while the return to power of the Catholic Church and the reduction of the size of armies quickly created enemies to the regime.

It was in this context that Napoleon landed in France on 1 March 1815. With an army initially reduced, it recruited the discontented and walked across the country. Louis XVIII fled Paris on 19 March, and the regime fell the next day, at the arrival of Napoleon at the Tuileries. Louis XVIII went into exile in Ghent. It was only after the Hundred Days and the Battle of Waterloo that Louis XVIII was able to return to the throne, inaugurating the Second Restoration.

== From the Empire to the return of the monarchy ==
=== A confused political situation ===
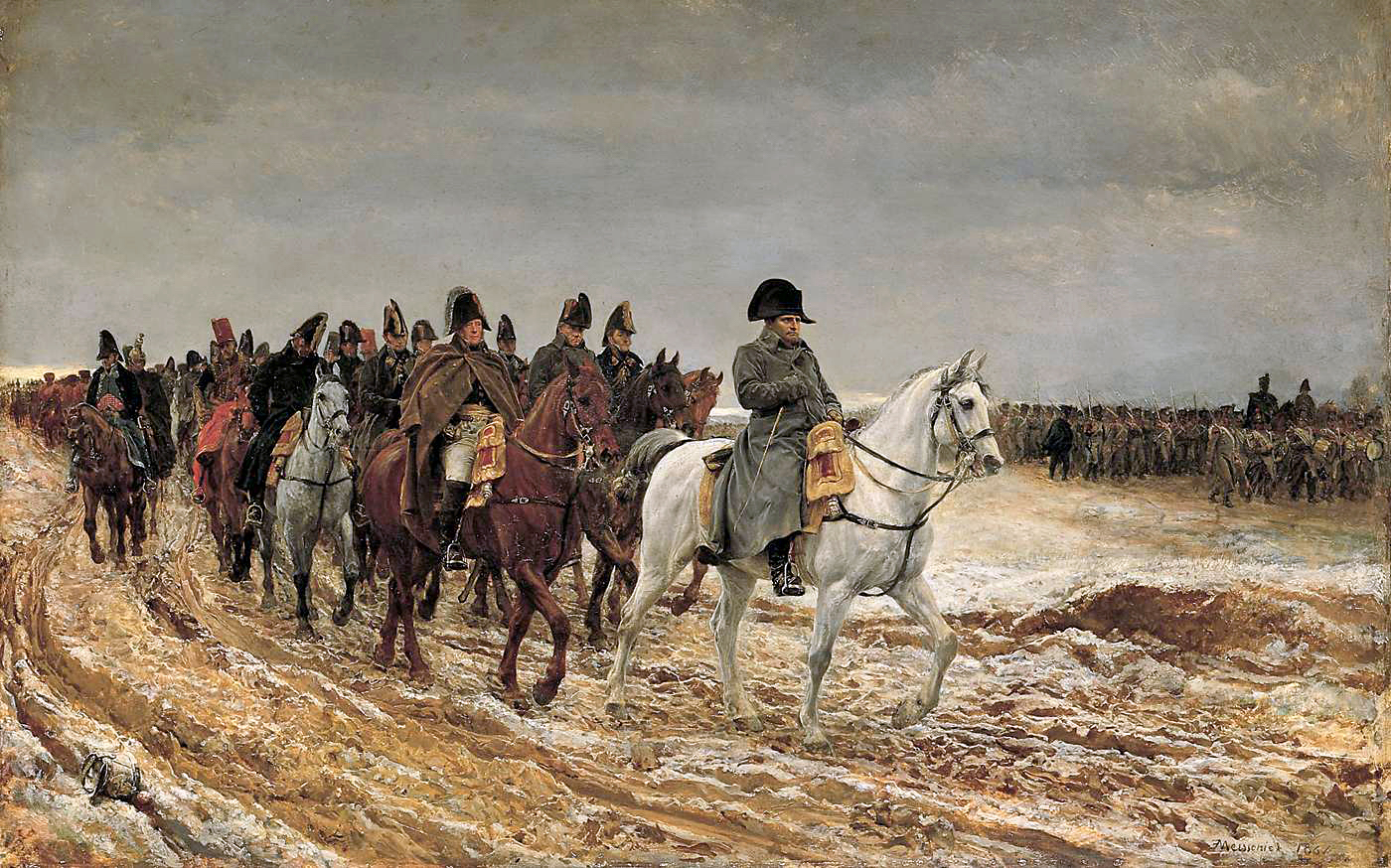
The troubled context of the campaign of France proved favorable to the restoration of the monarchy.

At the beginning of 1814, France faced the Sixth Coalition, consisting of the United Kingdom of Great Britain and Ireland, the Russian Empire, the Kingdom of Prussia, Sweden, the Austrian Empire, and several German states. The troops of this group of countries were then invading French territory. Although Napoleon I achieved several successes during the campaign of France, his military situation was increasingly precarious, while the population expressed its desire for peace more firmly. More than a monarchical restoration, the coalition initially considered concluding peace with Napoleon and engaged in negotiations to that end. The Emperor, overestimating his chances, caused them to fail by refusing any peace that would remove France's natural borders as they were during the Coup of 18 Brumaire. Thereafter, the coalition signed the Treaty of Chaumont on 1 March, by which they swore not to sign separate peaces until Napoleon's abdication.

French public opinion regarding the monarchy was confused and varied by region. On the eastern border, many launched resistance movements against foreign invaders. Conversely, the arrival of the Russians in Paris was hailed as a liberation. War weariness, anger sparked by military levies and taxes, and the desire of nobles—whether from the Ancien Régime or the Empire—to retain their goods and status united much of the population behind the idea of a monarchical restoration. This unity seemed assured until the crisis's outcome.

The allies had divergent interests. The Austrian Empire favored abdication in favor of Napoleon's son, with tutelage entrusted to his Austrian mother Marie Louise. The Russian Empire, unfavorable to the Bourbons, proposed placing Bernadotte, then Crown Prince of Sweden and Norway, on the throne, but his presence at the head of one of the coalition armies worked against him. The solution of the cadet branch of Orléans had supporters among those fearing a return to absolutism, but the future Louis Philippe I refused it at the time. The Bourbon solution had British support. Concretely, to avoid disputes within the coalition, the allies let internal events decide the final orientation.

=== Toward the monarchy ===
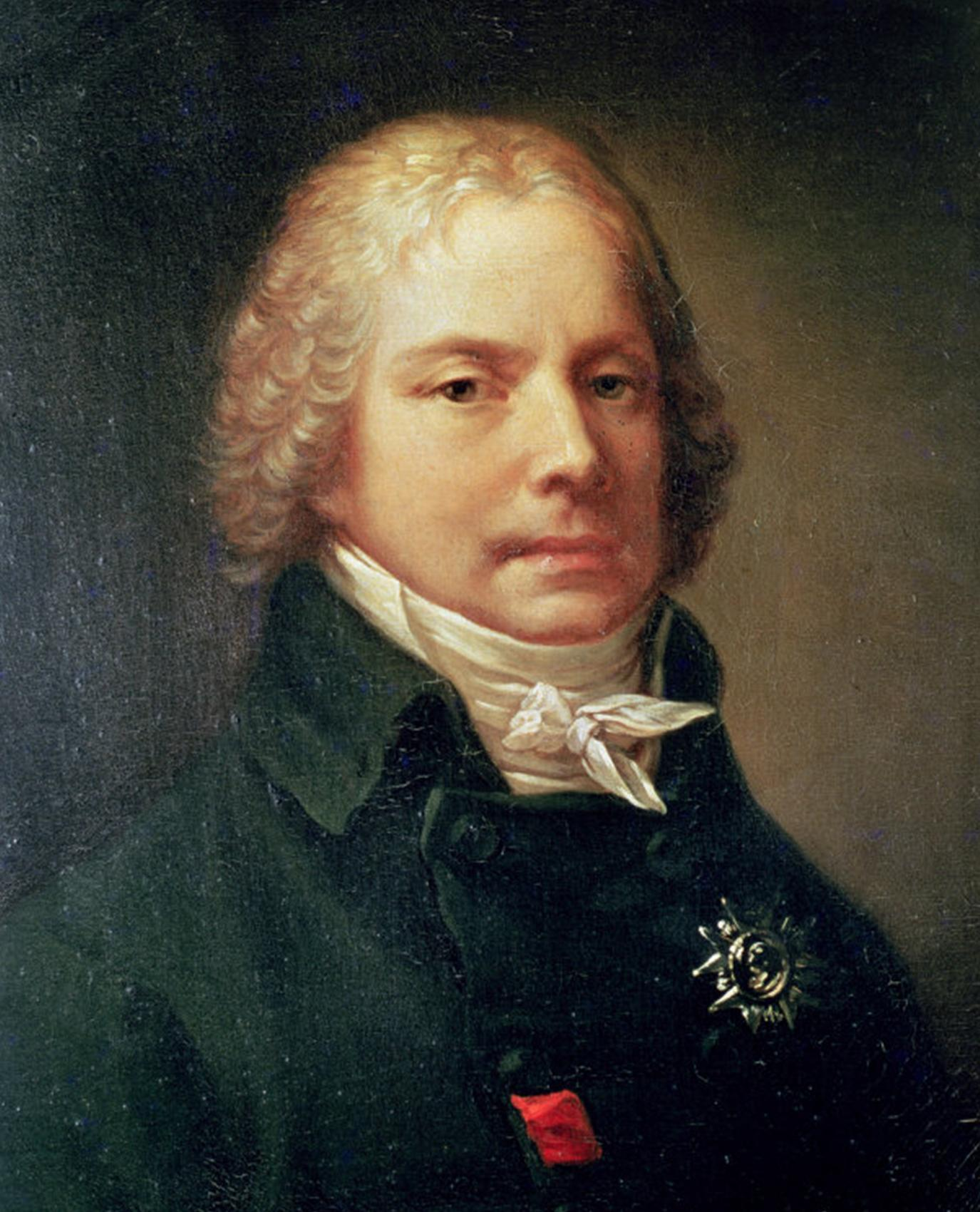
The political maneuvers of Talleyrand enabled the return of the monarchy.

While the Count of Provence, brother of Louis XVI and pretender to the throne under the name "Louis XVIII", awaited events at his residence in Hartwell House, his brother, the Count of Artois, followed the allied armies invading eastern France. The Bourbons, fearing the allies might install another dynasty, had to occupy the ground and garner internal support. The Count of Artois's two sons were also ready to intervene. The Duke of Berry was in Jersey, awaiting a Norman uprising. The elder, the Duke of Angoulême, benefited from 12 March from the insurrection led in Bordeaux by the Knights of the Faith of Ferdinand de Bertier de Sauvigny: Mayor Jean-Baptiste Lynch rallied to the Bourbons and welcomed the prince that day, allowing him to form a provisional government. The British invested the city, but with negotiations still ongoing with Napoleon, Wellington held back until the Treaty of Chaumont was concluded. Unrest also broke out in the Midi, and Lyon swung in favor of the Bourbons.

The Regency Council had retreated south of the Loire with the rest of the imperial army. Napoleon faced pressure at Fontainebleau from his marshals, who urged him to abdicate. The only Regency Council member remaining in Paris, Talleyrand, was master of the game to begin discussions on 31 March with Tsar Alexander, who had entered the capital at the head of allied troops. But his action was hindered by the Knights of the Faith in Paris, who organized a royalist demonstration in the capital upon the allies' entry. Moreover, they obtained from the Russian emperor the promise that the Count of Provence would be restored to the throne. Indeed, as the emperor passed under Madame de Semallé's windows, wife of Jean René Pierre de Semallé, Knight of the Faith and a key organizer of the demonstration, she said: "Long live Alexandre if he gives us back our Bourbons!", to which he replied "Yes, Madam, you will see them again. Long live your King Louis XVIII and the lovely ladies of Paris!". Talleyrand nevertheless managed to sideline them and maneuvered the Senate and the Legislative Body, which declared the Emperor's forfeiture on 2 April and offered the Count of Provence the French throne.

On 1 April, the General Council's Proclamation, inspired by Nicolas François Bellart, impressed the Parisian bourgeoisie with its legitimism.

Talleyrand had meanwhile convinced the tsar, unfavorable to the Bourbons, that the Restoration was the only way to permanently remove Napoleon. But the Frenchman wanted it on his terms. He obtained the designation of a provisional government of five members he presided over, effectively supplanting the royal commissioners who had obtained significant powers from the Count of Artois, and had a monarchist-spirited Constitution, close to the 1791 Constitution, adopted on 6 April. Its article 2 specified: "The French people freely call upon the brother of the last king to ascend to the throne of France." The text was to be submitted to the French people, and Louis XVIII had to swear to observe and enforce it, which displeased royalists who believed the king should rule without popular consent. Some even said a constitution was, by definition, regicidal.

The same day, Napoleon accepted abdication and concluded the Treaty of Fontainebleau, signed on 14 April. He became sovereign of the Principality of Elba and was promised a lifetime annuity by France.

=== The Bourbons' game and the return to peace ===
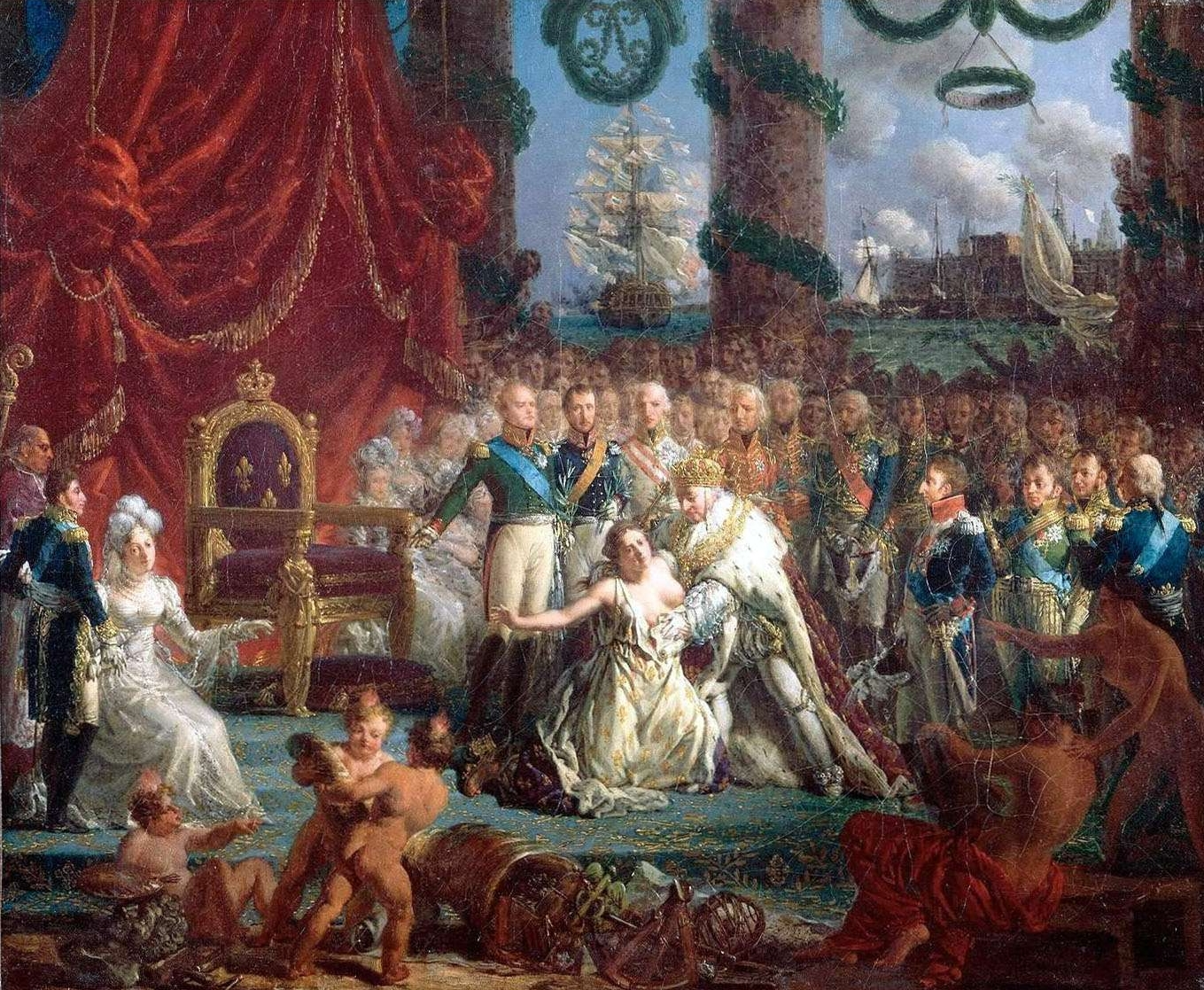
Louis XVIII Raising France from Its Ruins, allegory of the Bourbons' return by Louis-Philippe Crépin.

On 12 April, the Count of Artois was warmly welcomed by the population when he entered Paris displaying the white cockade, royalist symbol, while advocating peace and unity: he was made to say "No more divisions, no more divisions, peace and France; I see it again, and nothing has changed, except that there is one more Frenchman" but this popular enthusiasm was only temporary. The Senate recognized him as lieutenant general of the kingdom, but Talleyrand and Fouché, back in Paris, insisted he accept the constitutional project's principles without conviction, though abstaining from swearing on the text. He kept the government in place, adding rallied marshals (Oudinot and Moncey) and Vitrolles, his personal advisor. Hostile to liberalism, he maintained, alongside this government, a green cabinet, an occult government of émigrés and counter-revolutionaries that aroused fear among rallied Bonapartists. The white flag replaced the tricolor, to the great dismay of soldiers already hurt by defeat.

Louis XVIII landed at Calais on 24 April. On 2 May, the Declaration of Saint-Ouen before senators who came to meet him challenged popular sovereignty and referred the constitutional text to a commission to "improve" it, while expressing the impossibility of a pure return to the Ancien Régime. Thus, while issuing criticisms calling for corrections, Louis XVIII promised preservation of its major principles. He proclaimed himself "Louis, by the grace of God, King of France and Navarre", continuing the title he appropriated upon the death of Louis XVI's son in 1795. This idea of monarchical continuity between Louis XVI, Louis XVII, and Louis XVIII, denying the revolutionary period, was prominent in the king's statements. On 3 May, from the Château de Saint-Ouen, he made a solemn entry into Paris via the barrière Saint-Denis and reached the Tuileries Palace after hearing a Te Deum at Notre-Dame de Paris. The new reconciliation government was established on 13 May. Former émigrés remained a minority.

Peace was concluded with the Allies on 30 May: the first Treaty of Paris restored France to its 1792 borders, with some territorial gains to spare French feelings. However, there were losses regarding the colonies: Tobago, Saint Lucia, and Île de France. France paid no indemnities, suffered no occupation, and was to have representation at the Congress of Vienna. These favorable terms were obtained by Talleyrand and Tsar Alexander. The loss of the imperial conquests, which became a theme of discontent, would long be used by liberals to criticize the monarchy.

== Operation of the regime ==
=== The Charter ===
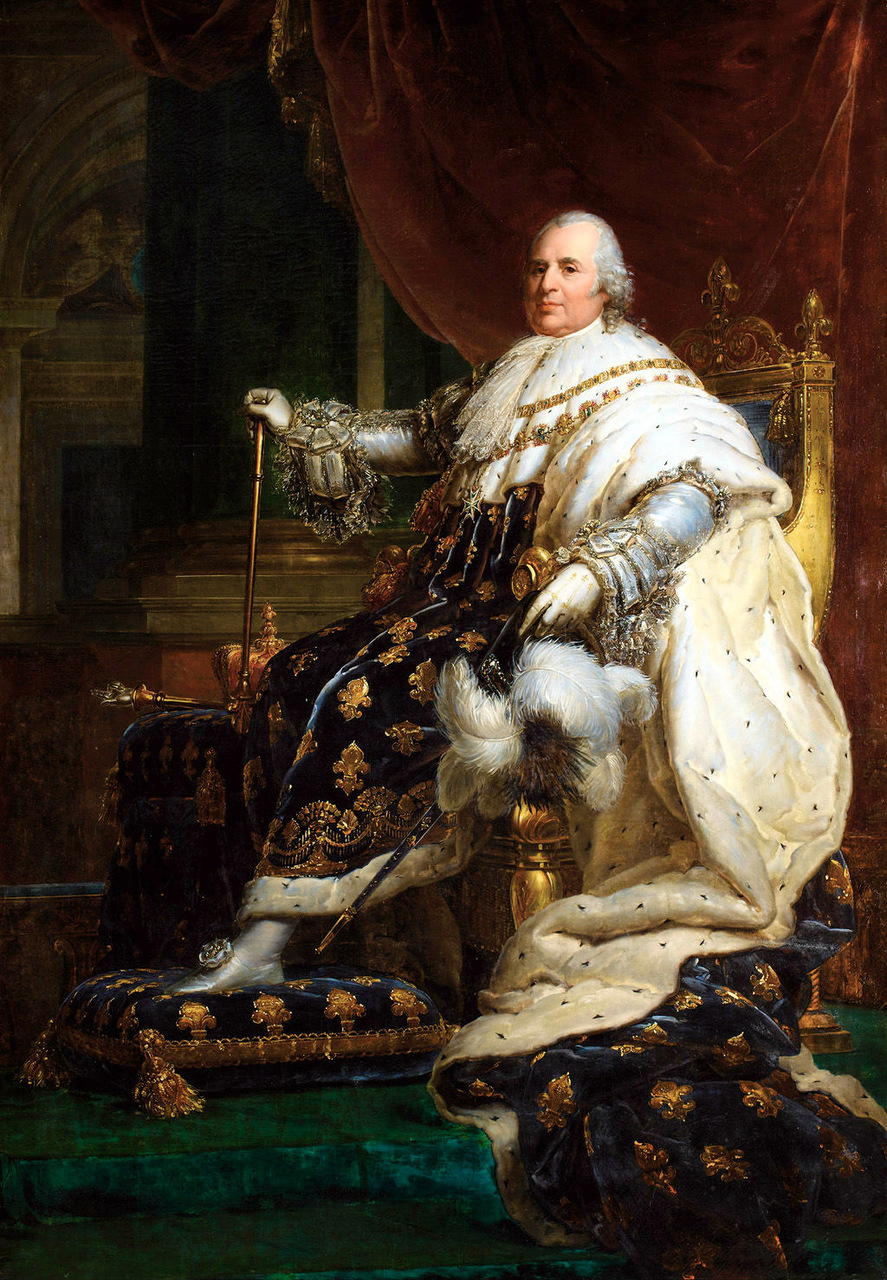
While a compromise with revolutionary heritage, the Charter of 1814 gave a predominant place to the sovereign, Louis XVIII.

Before the Allies left France, a constitution had to be drafted. Louis XVIII could not conceive of returning to the throne of France through a call from the people. He rejected the Senate's proposed constitution and entrusted the drafting of a new text to a commission of varied composition (former emigrants, members of the Constituent Assembly, nobles of the Empire). Rather than using the term "constitution," it was decided to speak of a "Charter", granted on 4 June 1814 by the sovereign in continuity with the concessions offered by his predecessors. This desire for a link with the past is omnipresent, particularly in the terms used: the text wishes to "rejoin the chain of time," neglects the revolutionary and imperial period by speaking of the "nineteenth year of the reign" of the sovereign, thus judging that he has been king since the death of his nephew in the Temple prison in 1795, and places the charter in the line of concessions made by Louis VI the Fat in the early 12th century. The sovereign renounced the sacre tradition to avoid offending moderates.

The Charter intended to be a text of compromise, preserving many achievements of the Revolution and the Empire, while restoring the Bourbon dynasty. Its first part recognized equality before the law, tax, public employment access, religious freedom (though Catholicism was state religion), and press freedom. National goods were favorably treated for revolutionary buyers: only unsold goods returned to émigrés. Political amnesty was declared for pre-1814 acts. The Charter established a regime dominated by the person of the king, who had a decisive role in the institutions: "All authority (resides) in France in the person of the King." He could declare war and sign peace, govern by ordinance if the situation required it, and his person was inviolable. He held executive, legislative, and judicial powers. It was he who proposed and promulgated laws, and he could at will dissolve the Chamber of Deputies or change the majority in the Chamber of Peers by appointing new members.

Therefore, the chambers share power with the king and can "entreat him to propose a law on any subject whatsoever." The Chamber of Deputies has priority in examining finance bills, but these cannot be established without the consent of both chambers. The Chamber of Deputies was elected by census suffrage by voters over 30 paying 300 francs cens. The electorate numbers about 110,000 Frenchmen, with only 16,000 meeting the eligibility criteria, out of a population of 30 million. The number of deputies increases from 262 to 395. Regarding the Chamber of Peers (the upper house), peers are appointed by the king and remain peers for life. The king thus appointed the 154 peers of the realm on 7 March 1814. Chambers had more power than under the Empire. Judicially, the monarchy followed Napoleonic achievements, notably the Civil Code.

This charter, drafted as a compromise, provokes disappointment. The most committed monarchists, particularly the Chevaliers de la Foi, believe the king should not have accepted a constitutional text and should reign by full right, as in the Ancien Régime. The regime's British inspiration was criticized. However, the text remains sufficiently obscure and ambiguous for all parties to find something in it, and its future application remains unclear, potentially leading to either a constitutional monarchy on the English model or a limited absolutism, notably thanks to Article 14, which authorizes the king to legislate by ordinance for the "safety of the state".

=== Policy of the First Restoration ===
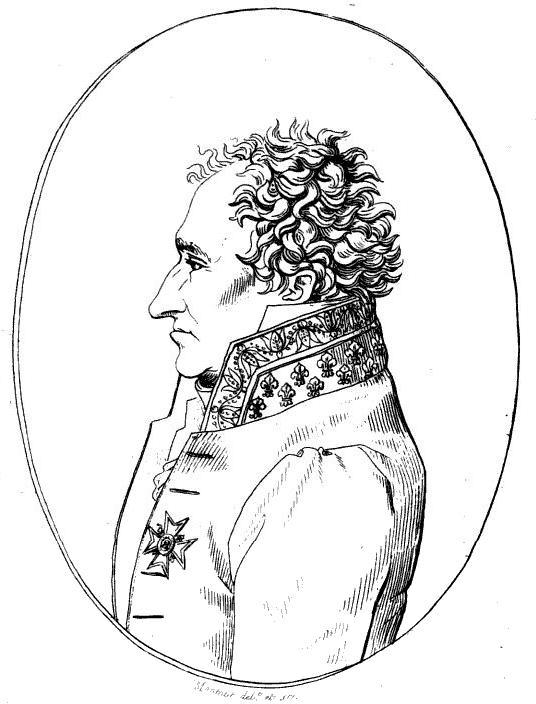
Baron Louis was, through his budget policy, the key figure of the First Restoration.

Around the King, the Court was organized on the model of the Ancien Régime with the establishment of a Maison du Roi and a Maison militaire. The government lacked a clear head; a role that could have been filled by Talleyrand, but he was preoccupied with representing France at the Congress of Vienna. Ministers sat in a Conseil d'en haut competing with a Privy Council, Ancien Régime copies. Divided, government members consequently developed the habit of dealing separately and directly with the monarch. Furthermore, the British and Russian ambassadors, Wellington and Pozzo di Borgo, maintained close scrutiny over the government's actions and involved themselves in major political debates.

Having been away from France and its people for many years, the King ordered the establishment of an extensive system of inquiries and statistical surveys during the spring and summer of 1814 to obtain an accurate picture of the country's state of mind. He also took advantage of press freedom to inform himself about criticisms of the regime. He further ensured that the Imperial nobility was treated with consideration to secure its loyalty to the new regime. Within the administration, whether among mayors or prefects, as well as the bulk of civil servants, purges remained very limited, as officials were quick to pledge allegiance to the monarchy. Even regicides were scarcely troubled. For example, among 87 prefects, there were only seven émigrés compared to 31 Imperial officials.

The period's key figure was Baron Louis, the Minister of Finance, tasked with restoring the state's finances. He retained the Empire's fiscal foundations, notably the Droits réunis (renamed "indirect contributions," which taxed everyday goods like wine and salt, contributing to the regime's unpopularity among the poor), despite promises made by the Count of Artois that this tax would be abolished. The finance minister confirmed the legality of the acquisitions of biens nationaux (national property) and, to pay the state's debts, decided to sell 300,000 hectares of forest, much of which had been confiscated from the clergy during the Revolution. The ownership of national property by its purchasers during the Revolution was thus reaffirmed, reassuring the business bourgeoisie. Louis XVIII demonstrated a will for pardon, forgetting, and national reconciliation. He aimed for an amalgamation of elites (reflected notably in the composition of the Chamber of Peers, which mixed Imperial senators and newly arrived nobles), a policy that attracted many intellectuals and liberals. Conversely, returning émigrés, back after two decades of absence and hoping for the restitution of their property, multiplied reactionary demands and sought privileges lost with the Revolution.

The clergy imposed processions and expiatory ceremonies for the victims of the Revolution, banned Sunday dances, and sometimes even refused sacraments to owners of national property. In the south of the country, exactions against Huguenots reminiscent of the time of the French Wars of Religion were noted. This climate was encouraged by the government, which made Sunday rest obligatory. The Church secured the abolition of the University's monopoly (ordinance of 5 October 1814), and a bishop henceforth presided over the Royal Council of Public Instruction.

Within the framework of budgetary policy, the Army's manpower was reduced, and its budget cut by a third. On 12 May, Louis XVIII issued an ordinance reorganizing the French army's infantry corps to "determine the strength and organization of the French army's infantry for peacetime," which abandoned the tricolour flag in favour of the white flag of the Kingdom of France. Survivors of the Imperial Guard were dispersed to distant garrisons. Officers placed on half-pay, inactive and with their salaries halved, could not understand the honors sometimes bestowed upon émigrés who had served in armies hostile to the Republic and the Empire—and thus had fought against France. Moreover, young officers saw promising careers slipping away from them. Thus, while the budgetary policy was guided by a desire for the country's recovery, it was also highly clumsy. Opposition began to stir, with some jacquerie-style peasant revolts noted. For public opinion, this represented an apparent return to the Ancien Régime: the lavish court at the Tuileries, and the outdated etiquette of a nobility that seemed to have forgotten nothing and learned nothing.

== A brief regime ==
=== Discontents and the Emperor's return ===
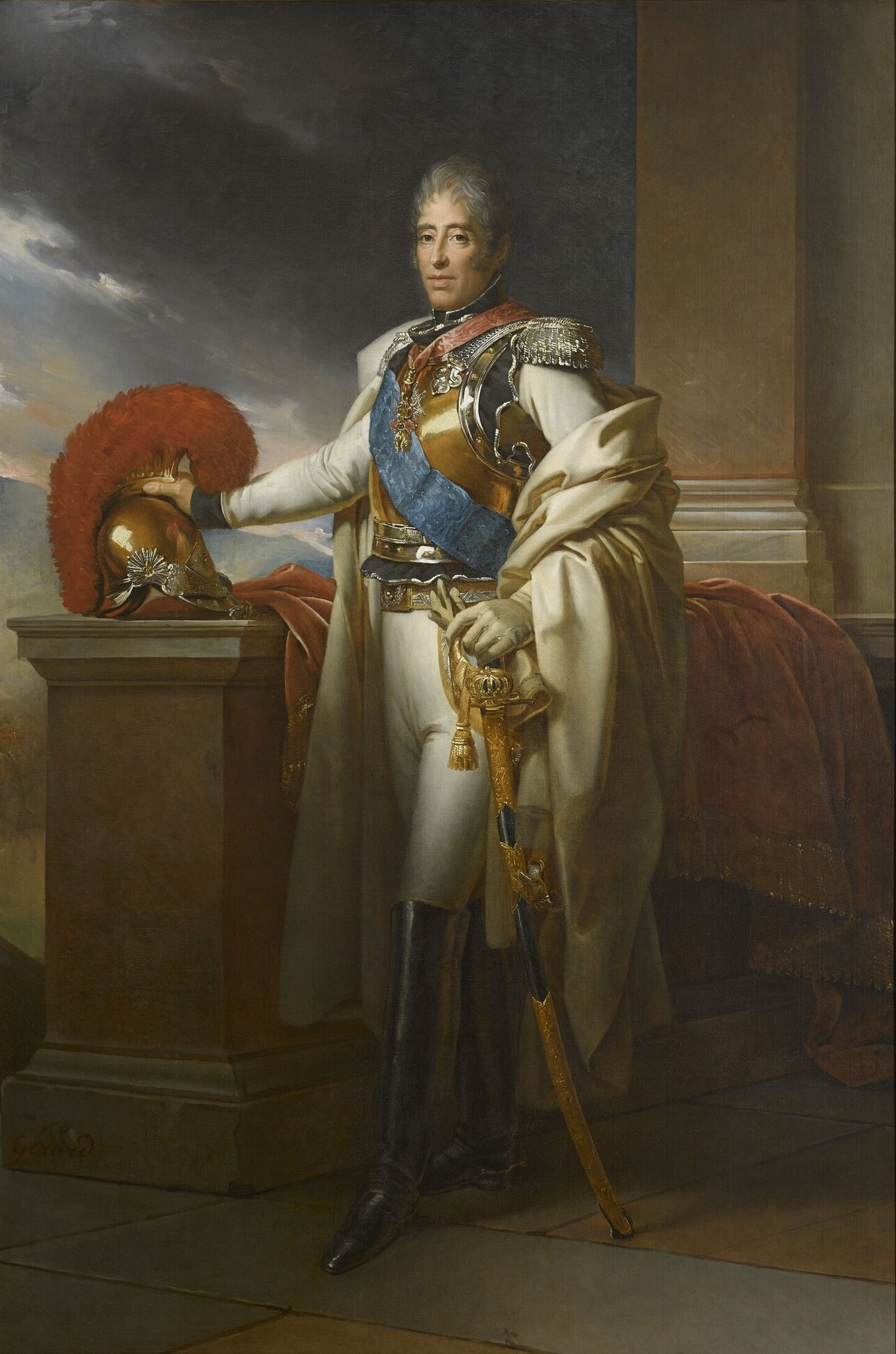
Disappointed monarchists by the Charter rallied around the king's brother, Count of Artois.

The regime's acceptance hinged on the peace so desired by the French. However, after a few months in practice, the Restoration began to generate its own discontents. A certain resentment towards a Louis XVIII perceived as not going far enough in returning to the Ancien Régime emerged among the most committed royalists, who rallied around the king's brother, the Count of Artois, heir to the throne. While the king primarily aimed to place his regime under the banner of forgetting and forgiveness to unite the country, these Ultras, along with the Church, harmed this cause through their excesses. Measures such as the obligation of Sunday rest, for instance, fueled surges of anti-clericalism.

Discontent also surfaced within the military. The king's budgetary cuts and the dismissal of three-fifths of the Imperial army caused dismay. Many former soldiers were unable to return to civilian life under good conditions, especially older ones who could not readjust. The foreign occupation of certain regions and the defeat of the Empire also wounded patriotic sensibilities in the provinces, and many viewed with suspicion a regime that seemed subservient to foreign powers. The government's inaction in the face of difficulties affecting the popular classes and the retention of the droits réunis, including a highly unpopular tax on beverages, further fueled popular anger against the regime. In a violent Mémoire addressed to the king, published clandestinely but widely circulated in July 1814, Lazare Carnot expressed this growing discontent and the grievances leveled at Louis XVIII. Critics were also increasingly affected by a censorship that was gradually being re-established.

Faced with this unpopularity, Napoleon I, confined to the island of Elba, appeared as the man capable of uniting the dissatisfied. The Emperor, whose promised annuity the regime had decided not to pay, grew increasingly exasperated with his situation and contemplated taking action. On 1 March 1815, he landed with a thousand men at Golfe-Juan, ready to retake power.

=== Toward the Hundred Days and Second Restoration ===
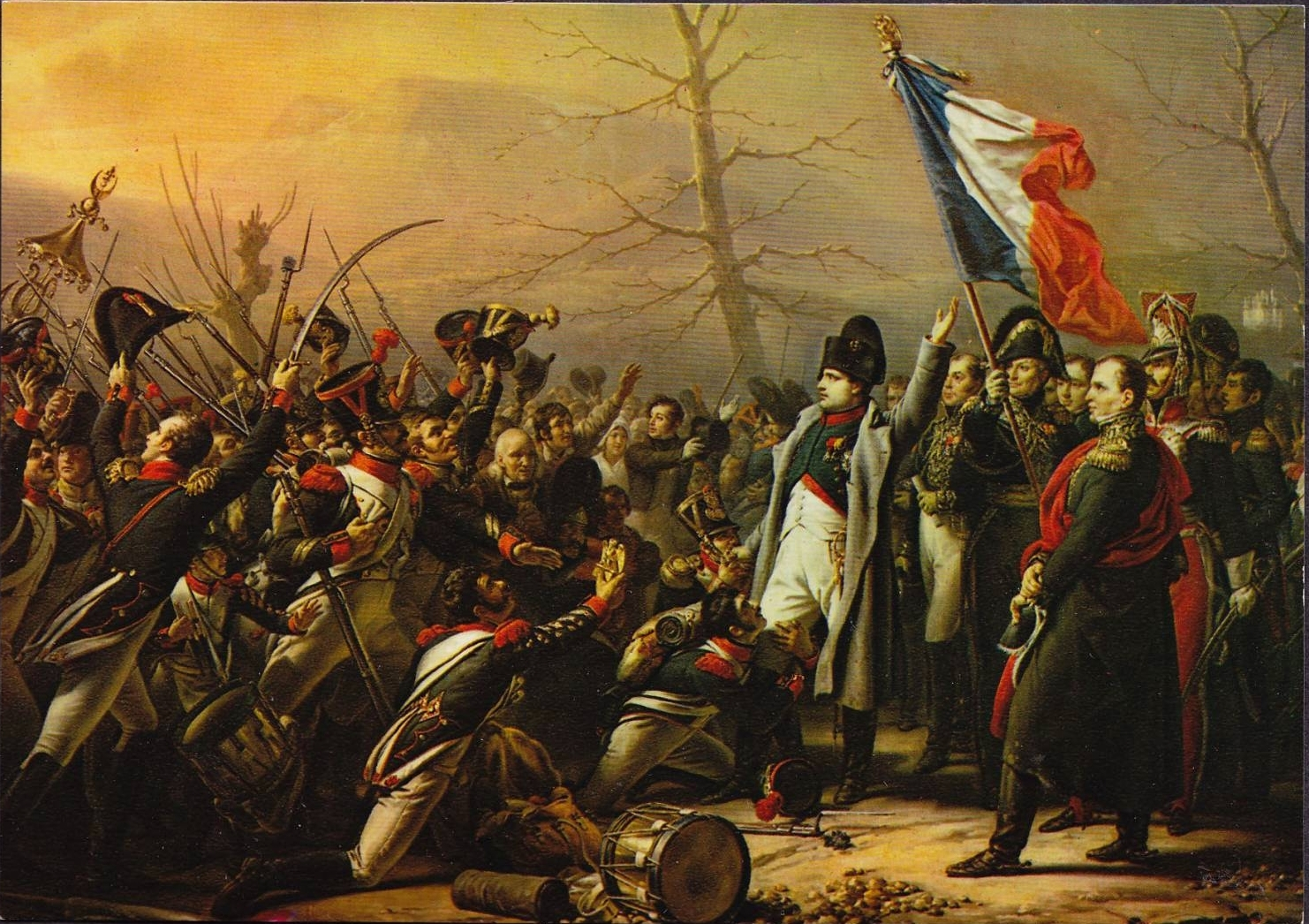
During Napoleon's advance, many troops sent to stop him joined him.

Napoleon I's advance through southern France proceeded easily and at great speed. By 7 March, he reached Grenoble, where he received a triumphant welcome that confirmed his hopes for success. The authorities initially reacted calmly; for Louis XVIII, this could be an opportunity to be rid of the Emperor once and for all. Orders were given for all military personnel to arrest him. The king dispatched the Count of Artois and Marshal Macdonald to Lyon to block his route, but worker demonstrations and the defection of the soldiers defending the city—who joined the first Imperial contingents—forced their flight, causing government concern. As the Napoleonic forces progressed, Louis XVIII appealed before the Chambers to defend the Charter in an effort to rally public opinion. While his appeal garnered support from those assembled, effective mobilization was very weak, and the defense of Paris appeared impossible.

Popular Marshal Ney, sent to arrest Napoleon, seemed the monarchy's last hope. His defection to the Emperor was therefore a severe blow to the regime. The king's options dwindled. Some in his entourage hoped for a royalist uprising in the Vendée, while others saw flight as the only viable solution. The king decided to leave Paris on 19 March, and Napoleon entered the Tuileries Palace next day. In the provinces, a few actions were taken in favor of the monarchy. For instance, Vitrolles attempted to form a royalist government in Toulouse but was arrested. In Bordeaux, the Duchess of Angoulême, daughter of Louis XVI, tried to rouse the guard. Simultaneously, her husband attempted to march an army on Lyon. All these enterprises, however, ended in failure.

During this period of the Hundred Days, Louis XVIII organized a government in Ghent, where a few loyal followers like Chateaubriand joined him. Nevertheless, Louis XVIII was aware that the fate of his throne lay in the hands of foreign powers, who needed to overthrow the Emperor. This was accomplished on 18 June 1815, at the Battle of Waterloo. Four days later, Napoleon I abdicated once more. While Louis XVIII reclaimed power, he had done so via a great French defeat. This unhappy memory to France would tarnish the regime's popularity and reputation (and, by extension, the legitimacy of the Second Restoration itself) until its end in the 1830 July Revolution.

== See also ==
- Napoleon's first abdication
- Second Restoration
- Ghent government in exile

== Bibliography ==
- Furet, François (1995). Revolutionary France 1770-1880 (in French). Oxford, Oxfordshire, United Kingdom: Blackwell. ISBN 978-0631170297. OCLC 1076274243.
- Tombs, Robert (1996). France 1814–1914 (in French). London: Longman. ISBN 978-1138135239. OCLC 938992305.
- Bruguière, Michel (1969). La Première Restauration et son budget [The First Restoration and its budget] (in French). Librairie Droz. ISBN 978-2-262-00912-0.
- Démier, Francis (2012). La France sous la Restauration (1814-1830) [France under the Restoration (1814–1830)] (in French). Paris: Éditions Gallimard. ISBN 978-2-07-039681-8.
- Goujon, Bertrand (2012). Monarchies postrévolutionnaires, 1814-1848 [Post-revolutionary monarchies, 1814–1848]. L'univers historique, Histoire de la France contemporaine (in French). Paris: Éditions du Seuil. ISBN 978-2-02-103347-2.
- Jardin, André; Tudesq, André-Jean (1973). La France des notables [France of the notables: I. General evolution, 1815–1848] (in French). Éditions du Seuil. ISBN 2-02-000666-9.
- Simon, Pierre (2010). L'élaboration de la charte constitutionnelle de 1814 [The elaboration of the constitutional charter of 1814] (in French). Nabu Press.
- de Waresquiel, Emmanuel; Yvert, Benoît (1996). Histoire de la Restauration (1814-1830) [History of the Restoration (1814–1830): birth of modern France] (in French). Éditions Perrin. ISBN 978-2-262-00912-0.
- Yvert, Benoît (2013). La Restauration, Les idées et les hommes [The Restoration, ideas and men] (in French). Paris: CNRS. ISBN 978-2-271-07738-7.
- de Waresquiel, Emmanuel (2015). C'est la Révolution qui continue ! La Restauration, 1814-1830 [The Revolution continues! The Restoration, 1814-1830] (in French). Taillandier.
- Guerrin, Yann (2014). La France après Napoléon [France after Napoleon: invasions and occupations, 1814–1818] (in French). Éditions L'Harmattan.
