= Jules-Paul Pasquier =

French member of the Conseil d'État

- Born: 25 January 1774; Paris, France
- Died: 28 December 1858 (aged 84)
- Resting place: Coulans-sur-Gée
- Title: Baron
- Relatives: Étienne-Denis Pasquier (brother)

Jules-Paul Pasquier (1774–1858) was a French member of the Conseil d'État.

== Early life ==
Jules-Paul Pasquier was born on 25 January 1774 in Paris. His father, Etienne Pasquier, was guillotined during the French Revolution.

== Career ==
He served as the prefet of the Sarthe departments from 1814 to 1818. He served as a member of the Conseil d'État.

He became a Commandeur of the Legion of Honor in 1844.

== Death ==
He died on 28 December 1858. He was buried in Coulans-sur-Gée.
