= André-Elzéard d'Arbaud de Jouques =

French aristocrat, lawyer and public official

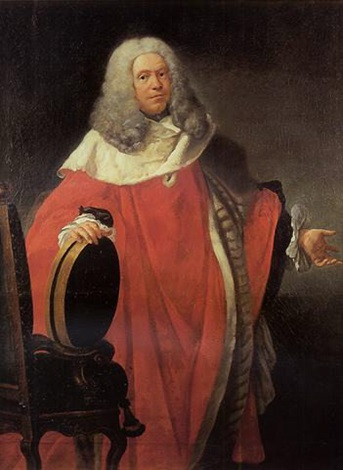
- Born: 1676
- Died: 1744 (aged 67–68)
- Occupation: Président à mortier of the Parlement of Aix-en-Provence
- Spouse: Anne de Citrany
- Children: Jean-Joseph-Augustin d'Arbaud; Bache-Alexandre d'Arbaud

André-Elzéard d'Arbaud de Jouques (1676–1744) was a French aristocrat, lawyer and public official.

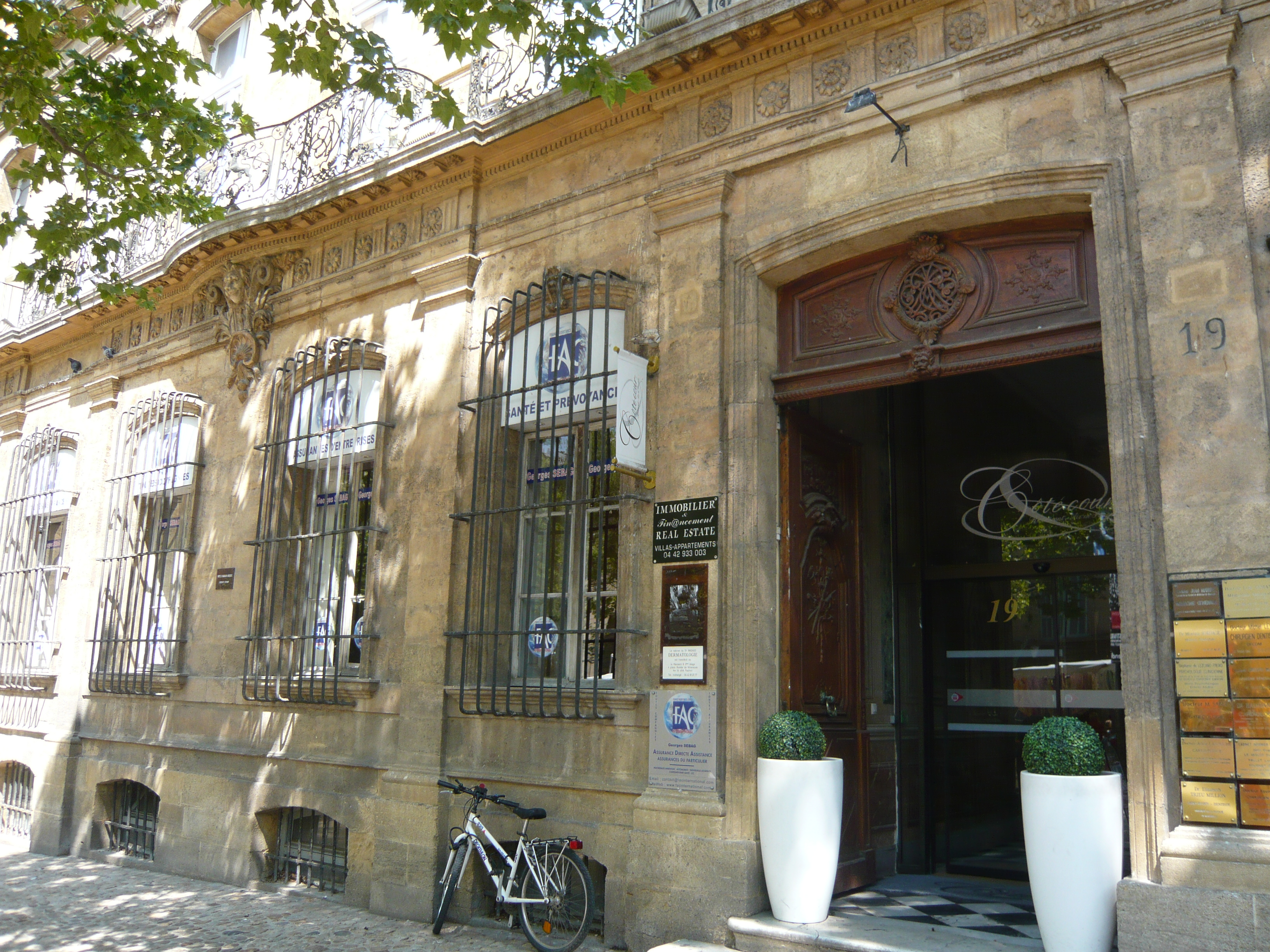
Hôtel d'Arbaud-Jouques in Aix-en-Provence

== Biography ==
=== Early life ===
André-Elzéard d'Arbaud was born in 1676. His father was Jacques Arbaud.

=== Career ===
He received the hereditary marquisate of Jouques in 1702, as well as the Lordship of Gardanne.

He served as an Advisor in the Parlement of Aix-en-Provence. In 1740, he served as its Président à mortier.

After his widowed mother purchased the Hôtel de Valbelle-Meyrargues on the Cours Mirabeau in 1695, he purchased the adjacent Hôtel de Séguiran and converted both hôtels particuliers into the Hôtel d'Arbaud-Jouques designed by the architect Jean-Baptiste Franque (1683-1758). It is now listed as a monument historique. Moreover, his portrait was painted by Michel-François Dandré-Bardon (1700–1785).

=== Personal life ===
In 1697, he married Anne de Citrany, daughter of Joseph de Citrany. They had four sons:

- Jean-Joseph-Augustin d'Arbaud de Jouques (1703-1775). He married Françoise-Lucrère-Cécile de Renaud, daughter of Jean de Renaud. They had two sons:
  - André-Elzéard d'Arbaud de Jouques II.
  - Joseph Bache d'Arbaud de Jouques.
- Gaspard d'Arbaud de Jouques.
- François-Casimir d'Arbaud de Jouques.
- Bache-Elzéar-Alexandre d'Arbaud de Jouques (1720-1793).

He died in 1744.
