= Antoine Sartorio =

French sculptor

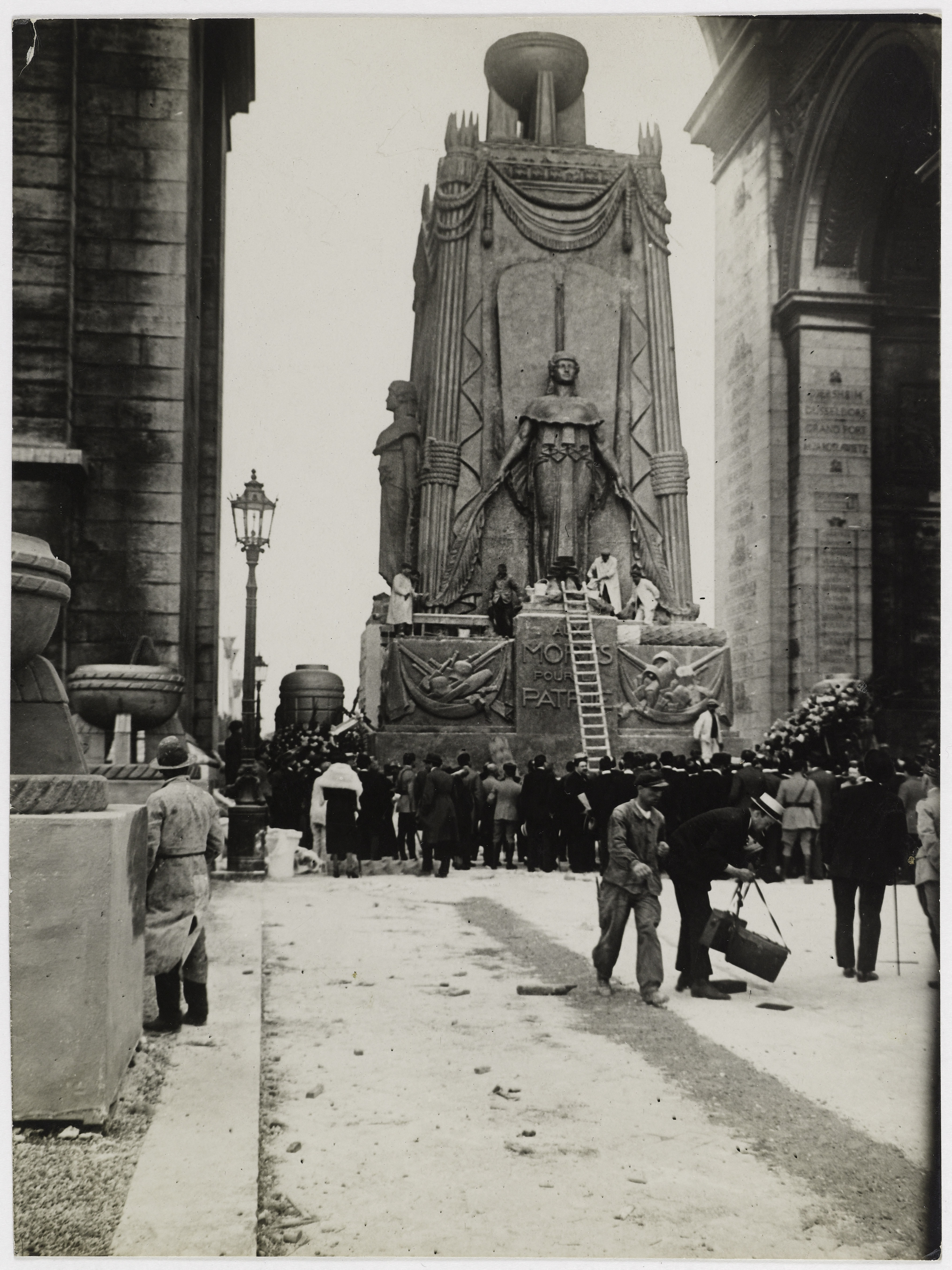
The temporary cenotaph by Sartorio at the Arc de Triomphe for the 1919 Bastille Day military parade.

Antoine Sartorio (27 January 1885, Menton – 19 February 1988, Jouques) was a French sculptor.

== Brief biography ==
Antoine Sartorio was born in Menton on 27 January 1885 and died in Jouques on 19 February 1988. He studied at the École des Beaux-Arts de Paris.

His relationship with the Marseille architect Gaston Castel, students together at the École des Beaux-Arts, led to his involvement with the Santos monument Andradas in 1922, work on the Opéra de Marseille in 1924, the Marseille Monument de l'Armée d'Orient in 1927, the works La Méditerranée" and "La Durance" for the Cavaillon bridge in 1932, decoration on the Marseille Palais de Justice in 1933, work on the monument to Alexandre 1er de Yougoslavie in 1938 and the "sept péchés" for Marseille's Baumettes Prison, also in 1938. He also worked with Paul Tournon.

As with most French sculptors he was commissioned after the 1914–1918 war to work on several war memorials such as those at Tournon-sur-Rhône and Menton.

He also contributed sculptures to the Lycée Tolbiac in Paris and the Lycées Marseilleveyre and Périer in Marseille and worked on the restoration of the "Le Baptême de Clovis" for Reims cathedral from 1962 to 1966.

In 1967 he left Paris and retired to Jouques.

His work had been shown at the Exhibition des Arts Décoratifs in Paris in 1925, at the "Exposition Coloniale de Vincennes" in 1931 and the "Exposition Universelle" in Paris in 1937.

== War memorials ==
When war broke out in 1914, Sartorio was called up to the 363rd Infantry regiment and saw action particularly in the Vosges. He was awarded the Croix de Guerre and whilst serving in the area around Senones, Sartorio created several memorials. These works helped to build his reputation and he was commissioned to create a temporary cenotaph placed under the Arc de Triomphe for the great victory celebrations held in Paris on 14 July 1919.

Name	Location	Date	Notes
"Aux glorieux morts 1914 – 1918"	Mont Pélé between Moyenmoutier and Senones	1915	Lt Colonel Dauphin, who commanded the 363rd, organized a provisional military cemetery here and Sartorio executed a sculpture for it. The simple inscription reads "pour la Patrie, pour l'Humanité"
"Pour la France"	Pierre-Percée	1915	This monument stands at the entrance of Pierre-Percée's cemetery. It is a bas-relief dedicated to all who fought with the 363rd Infantry in the action at La Chapelotte. Sartorio served in this regiment. The bas-relief depicts soldiers at the front led by a winged "angel of victory".
Memorial to the 363rd French Infantry in Badonviller's French War Cemetery	Badonviller		In the French war cemetery at Badonviler there is a monument which again remembers the efforts of the 363rd French Infantry at La Chapelotte. See photograph below. The cemetery contains the remains of 2,653 Frenchmen of whom 1,209 lie in two ossuaries. The bodies here were moved from smaller burial plots at Angomont, Badonviller, Baccarat, Montigny, Neufmaisons, Pierre-Percée and Saint-Maurice.
Monument aux morts de l'Armée d'Orient et des terres lointaines	Marseille	1927	This monument stands in Marseille's square Lieutenant-Danjaume and remembers all those Frenchmen who gave their lives during the 1914–1918 war fighting overseas particularly in the Far East. The monument takes the form of an arch and stands on a rocky promontory on the Marseille's seafront. Marseille was the port of exit for those who travelled eastwards. Inauguration took place on 24 April 1927. The arch has at the centre the carving of a crescent and a star, the intrados being decorated with palms. Sartorio sculptures of air force personnel and soldiers stand on one side of the arch together with a winged angel whilst on another side is another winged angel and on a pedestal in the centre of the arch is Sartorio's bronze "angel of victory" her arms lifted to the skies. A stairway leading down to the sea completes the memorial.
Jouques War memorial (monument aux morts)	Jouques	1921	This limestone memorial, which stands in Jouques' boulevard de la République, was started by Gustave Salgé who died suddenly in 1920. Sartorio, a friend of Salgé, completed the work. The memorial also serves as a public fountain. It features a standing soldier. Sartorio retired to Jouques in 1965 when aged 80. His workshop has been preserved by the "Les Amis d'Antoine Sartorio" through whom visits can be arranged.
Ceyreste War memorial (monument aux morts)	Ceyreste	Around 1921	The memorial stands in Ceyreste's place des Héros. The statue of a woman is an allegory for Ceyreste. She holds a garland of laurel leaves.
Rambouillet War memorial (monument aux morts)	Rambouillet	1923	This limestone memorial, inaugurated on 23 September 1923 and standing in Rambouillet's place André Thome, features five large statues representing five stages of the 1914–1918 war; 1914 the Marne, 1915 the fighting in Artois, 1916 Verdun, 1917 the advance to victory and 1918 the final victory. These five figures stand on a rectangular pedestal on which are carved the names of the dead both of the 1914–1918 conflict and subsequent wars.
Septèmes-les-Vallons War memorial (monument aux morts)	Septèmes-les-Vallons		This memorial stands in the place du 8 Mai 1945. A soldier kneels on the ground and at his side a female figure stands with a wreath of flowers.
Manosque War memorial (monument aux morts)	Manosque	1921	This limestone memorial is located in Manosque's place du Terreau. A female allegory for victory stands on a pedestal. Her arms are held aloft and hold a crown and two palms. At the base of the pedestal two "fasces" stand on either side of the inscriptions "Champagne" and "Yser" two areas that saw the French army in action.
Tournon-sur-Rhône War memorial	Tournon-sur-Rhône	1922	The limestone memorial, cut into a rock, depicts an "angel of victory" ("une Victoire") who places crowns over the lists of those men of Tournon honoured.
Menton War memorial (monument aux morts)	Menton	1925	A sculpture of a woman stands on a column. Beneath the column the names of those killed in the Two World Wars are listed. In 1966 Sartorio was also commissioned to decorate the façade of Menton's Palais de Justice.

== Main works ==
Name	Location	Date	Notes
Monument celebrating Brazil's independence	Santos	1919	Gaston Castel, who won the Prix de Rome for architecture in 1913, had been mobilized in 1914 and joined the 258th Infantry. He received bad facial injuries whilst fighting at the front and for the rest of the war was interned in Montreux. After the war he returned to Paris and was soon appointed as architect for Bouches-du-Rhône but before taking up this post he travelled to Brazil with Sartorio to work on this Santos monument.
Post and Communications building	Cachan		Sartorio's haut-relief "L'accueil" is located in the building's foyer.
Cimetière Saint-Pierre (Marseille)	Marseille		Sartorio is buried here. He also executed the decoration for the tomb of the tenor Lucien Muratore.
The Castel residence	Marseille		Sartorio worked with Gaston Castel on the decoration of his residence in Marseille's place du Lacydon. He also decorated the Castel family tomb in Pertuis cemetery.
The Pennes-Mirabeau tunnel	Mirabeau		Sartorio's bas-relief "La Fortune" decorates the entrance to this tunnel.
Gare Maritime	Marseille	1955	Sartorio, again working with Castel, added decoration to shed 4 of this old terminal.
Lycée Périer	Marseille		In the school's "cour d'honneur" is a bas-relief depicting Athéna.
Lycée Marseilleveyre	Marseille	1956	Sartorio executed a sculpture for the school's entrance and the work "Vers l'Espace" for the garden.
Pont Mirabeau	Jouques		The statues that decorated this bridge are still kept just by the bridge itself. The bridge was constructed in 1935 to cross the river Durance near the village of Mirabeau and Sartorio created four bas-reliefs representing the four "départements" which join at the location, Bouches-du-Rhône, Vaucluse, Var and Alpes de Haute-Provence. In 1988 the bridge was replaced but the bas-reliefs are on display at a round-about on the river's left bank.
Palais de Justice	Marseille	1930–1933	The designing architect Gaston Castel was commissioned to supervise the new Palais de Justice annex and building started in 1930. The building's main façade on the rue Pollak has two classical péristyles crowned by Sartorio friezes.
Monument commemorating Alexander Ist of Yugoslavia and Louis Barthou	Marseille	1938	This monument, carved from Lens stone, commemorates the assassination in Marseille of the Yugoslavian king and Bathou in 1934 and was given the name "Paix et Travail" by the designing architect Gaston Castel who used the services of Sartorio, Elie-Jean Vézin and Botinelly for the sculptural work. The inauguration took place in 1941. At the front of the monuments medallions depicting the two victims are held by allegories by Sartorio representing "La Justice", "Le Droit", "La Liberté" et "Le Travail". The monument stands on the corner of the Rue de Rome and the Avenue Paul Peytral in Marseille's 6th arrondissement. The Musée d'histoire de la Ville de Marseille hold the design drawings and the plaster maquette which was shown at the agricultural section of the Paris Salon and won the gold prize.
Monument to Abel Ballif	Saint-Raphaël in Var	1934	Perched on the side of the "Corniche de l'Esterel" is a bas-relief honouring the founding president of Touring Club de France.
"l'Afrique"	Palais de Chaillot	1937	This bas-relief is one of several commissioned from 57 sculptors to decorate the external walls of the Chaillot palace for the Exhibition in Paris of 1937. The relief is on the façade of the building which looks onto the rue Franklin.
"Les sept péchés capitaux"	Baumettes prison Marseille	1938	In 1930 the decision was taken to build the Baumettes prison in Marseille and Gaston Castel was appointed as the designing architect. Building took place between 1931 and 1940. Castel commissioned Sartorio to execute seven haut-reliefs for the prison entrance, these depicting the seven deadly sins. They were completed around 1938 and depicted "La Colère", "La Paresse", " La Gourmandise", "L'Orgueil", "L'Envie", "La Luxure" and "L'Avarice". In "La Colère" a sinister and menacing man squats with his back turned and is armed with a knife and in "La Paresse" another squatting figure evokes lethargy. In "L'Avarice" the subject holds a money box close to his chest clearly having no intention of surrendering it to anyone. "La Gourmandise" depicts a drunkard and in "L'Orgueil" the subject, an allegory of a peacock, looks admiringly into a mirror denoting the sin of vanity (pride). In "La Luxure" we see Eve tempted by the serpent. In Sartorio's "L'Envie", the subject simply "glowers".
Marseille Opéra Municipal	Marseille	1921	Sartorio was one of several artists, both sculptors and painters, to work on the opera house when a major reconstruction took place between 1921 and 1924, this after a fire had gutted the old building which dated back to 1787. Only the columns of the peristyle and the main walls escaped the fire. Sartorio completed four allegorical reliefs for the upper floor façade which surmounts the peristyle. The reliefs align with the Ionic columns and follow the inscription on the upper cornice ""L'Art reçoit la Beauté d'Aphrodite, le Rhyme d'Apollon, d'Equilibre de Pallas et doit à Dyonisos le Mouvement et la Vie."" roughly translated as "Art receives beauty from Aphrodite, rhythm from Apollo, balance from Pallas and owes movement and life to Dionysus".
Durance Suspension Bridge.	Cavaillon	1932	Four reliefs decorated the suspension bridge built over the river Durance in 1932 between Vaucluse and Bouches-du-Rhône . Jean Lhomme sculpted the allegories of "Le Ventoux" and the "La Durance" on the Vaucluse side of the bridge and Sartorio the reliefs "La Méditerranée" and the "La Durance" on the Bouches-du-Rhône side. The bridge was blown up by the Germans in 1944 but plaster models can be seen in Cavaillon's local museum.
Monument to the Association Gueules cassées	Moussy-le-Vieux	1957	The monument stands at the entrance to the headquarters of the association Gueules-cassées based in the Château de Moussy and honours those who founded this association for those soldiers who suffered facial injuries in the 1914–1918 war. The inauguration in 1957 was officiated by René Coty the French president. It was to this building that the injured came to rest and convalesce between the various surgical operations undertaken to rebuild their faces. It was used again for those injured during the Second World War and those who suffered facial wounds in Indochina and Algeria.
Palais de la Méditerranée	Nice	1928	Built in 1928 on the Promenade des Anglais as a casino but now the Hyatt Regency Nice Palais de la Méditerranée hotel. Sartorio executed the bas-reliefs on the building's façade. Most of the original building was subsequently demolished but happily Sartorio's reliefs survived the changes.
"Le Rythme"	Lycée Claude-Monet.Paris	1950	This work is located in the lycée's hall.
