= Château de Coulans =

18th-century château in Sarthe, France

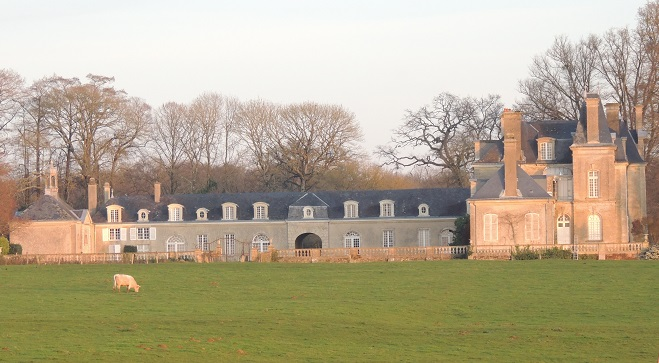

- Location within France

General information
- Coordinates: 48°0′51″N 0°1′35″E

The Château de Coulans is an 18th-century château in Coulans-sur-Gée, Sarthe, France. It has been partially listed as an official historical monument by the French Ministry of Culture since 1980.
