= André-Elzéard d'Arbaud de Jouques II =

French public official

- Born: 1737
- Died: 1793 (aged 55–56)
- Occupation: Président à mortier of the Parlement of Aix-en-Provence
- Parent(s): Jean-Joseph-Augustin d'Arbaud de Jouques; Françoise-Lucrèce-Cécile de Renaud
- Relatives: André-Elzéard d'Arbaud de Jouques (paternal grandfather)

André-Elzéard d'Arbaud II de Jouques (1737-1793) was a French aristocrat, lawyer and public official.

== Biography ==
=== Early life ===
André-Elzéard d'Arbaud II was born in 1737. His father was Jean-Joseph-Augustin d'Arbaud de Jouques (unknown-1768) and his mother, Françoise-Lucrèce-Cécile de Renaud. He had a brother, Joseph Bache d'Arbaud (1738-1812), and a sister, Anne Constance d'Arbaud (unknown-1789). He was named after his paternal grandfather, André-Elzéard d'Arbaud de Jouques (1676-1744).

=== Career ===
He inherited the marquisates of Jouques and Mison as well as the baronetcy of Ongles.

He served as Président à mortier of the Parlement of Aix-en-Provence in 1768.

=== Personal life ===
He was married to Gabrielle-Thérèse de Milan-Forbin, daughter of Joseph Charles Bernard Ignace de Milan de Forbin de La Roque and Marie Marthe de Bertet. They had three children:

- Joseph Charles André d'Arbaud de Jouques (1769–1849).
- Bache-Philippe Augustin d'Arbaud de Jouques.
- Melchior-Elzéard-André d’Arbaud de Jouques.

He was guillotined by revolutionaries on December 26, 1793, in Lyon due to his support of the King.
