= Declaration of Saint-Ouen =

1814 statement by Louis XVIII of France prior to resuming the throne

The Declaration of Saint-Ouen is a statement made by the future King Louis XVIII of France on 2 May 1814, which paved the way for the “First Restoration” of the House of Bourbon on the throne of France following its defeat in the Napoleonic Wars and Napoleon’s forced abdication and demise. It was issued in Saint-Ouen, north of Paris, shortly before his arrival in the capital.

Unlike Ferdinand VII of Spain, who repudiated a constitution in favor of absolutism upon his restoration in 1814, Louis limited himself to the revision of the Senate’s draft constitution while maintaining a claim to the recognition of unlimited monarchical sovereignty. The declaration also promised basic freedoms for the people as well as national representation and equality before the law.

== Declaration ==
Upon landing in France, the future king rejected the provisional constitution proposed by the Senate as part of the Treaty of Paris, stating that "the principles thereof were good" but since a great number of articles displayed the haste with which they were worded, "it could not in their present form become fundamental laws of the State." However, he promised to adopt a new "liberal constitution" to be drafted by a commission drawn by the Parliament.

Louis declared that the constitution would maintain representative government with a bicameral legislature, protect freedom of the press, freedom of opinion, and freedom of worship, and guarantee personal and public liberty. The declaration stated, notably, that the lands of the aristocrats who fled, which the Republic had sold at auction, were not to be confiscated, and that no restitution was to be given. Further, that the Napoleonic Code of Law was to remain in force, that the awards and social function of the Legion of Honor given to those loyal to Napoleon was not to be abolished. Napoleon's changes to the educational system, most notably the University of Paris, would remain. It was the desire to restore all these issues to their pre-revolutionary conditions that most dramatically defined the reactionaries. Many of the Ultra-royalists held these notions, thus becoming far more reactionary than the King's own policies.

The promised constitution was eventually adopted in the Charter of 1814.

== Sources ==
- Clément, Jean-Paul (July 2006) [Delivered 2005]. "La Déclaration de Saint-Ouen ou les vrais débuts de la Restauration". Cahiers de la Nouvelle Société des études sur la Restauration (in French). II. Paris: Nouvelle Société des études sur la Restauration: 7–30. ISSN 1761-6778.
