= Eugène François d'Arnauld =

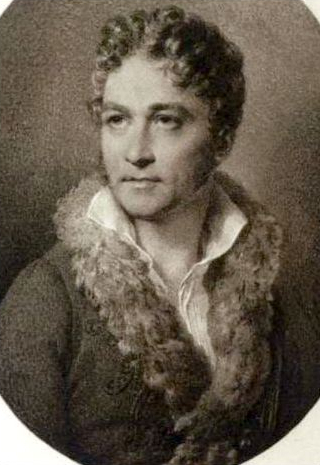
- Born: 11 August 1774; Vitrolles, Hautes-Alpes, France
- Died: 1 August 1854 (aged 79); Paris, France
- Occupation: Politician

Eugène François Auguste d'Arnauld, baron de Vitrolles (1774-1854) was a French aristocrat and politician.

== Biography ==
=== Early life ===
Eugène François d'Arnauld was born on 11 August 1774 in Vitrolles, Hautes-Alpes.

=== Career ===
Opposed to the French Revolution of 1789, he left France in 1791 and served in the Army of Condé to overthrow the French Directory. He returned to France in 1799. He supported the Bourbon Restoration of 1815, and tried to gain support for it in Provence during the Hundred Days, but he was jailed in the Château de Vincennes and later in the Prison de l'Abbaye.

He served as an Ultra-royalist in the Chamber of Deputies from 22 August 1815 to 5 September 1816. He also served as a Minister in 1815 and 1824.

=== Personal life ===
His son Oswald d'Arnaud married Augustine Marie Alexandrine Elisabeth d'Arbaud de Jouques, daughter of Joseph Charles André d'Arbaud de Jouques (1769-1849).

He died on 1 August 1854 in Paris.

== Bibliography ==
- De l’Économie publique réduite à un principe (1801).
- Le ministère dans le gouvernement représentatif (1814).
- Mémoires et relations politiques (1814-30) (Charpentier, 1884).
- Mémoires de Vitrolles (F. Paillart, 1952, Volume 2).
