= Hôtel d'Arbaud-Jouques =

Coordinates: 43.5268°N 5.4477°E

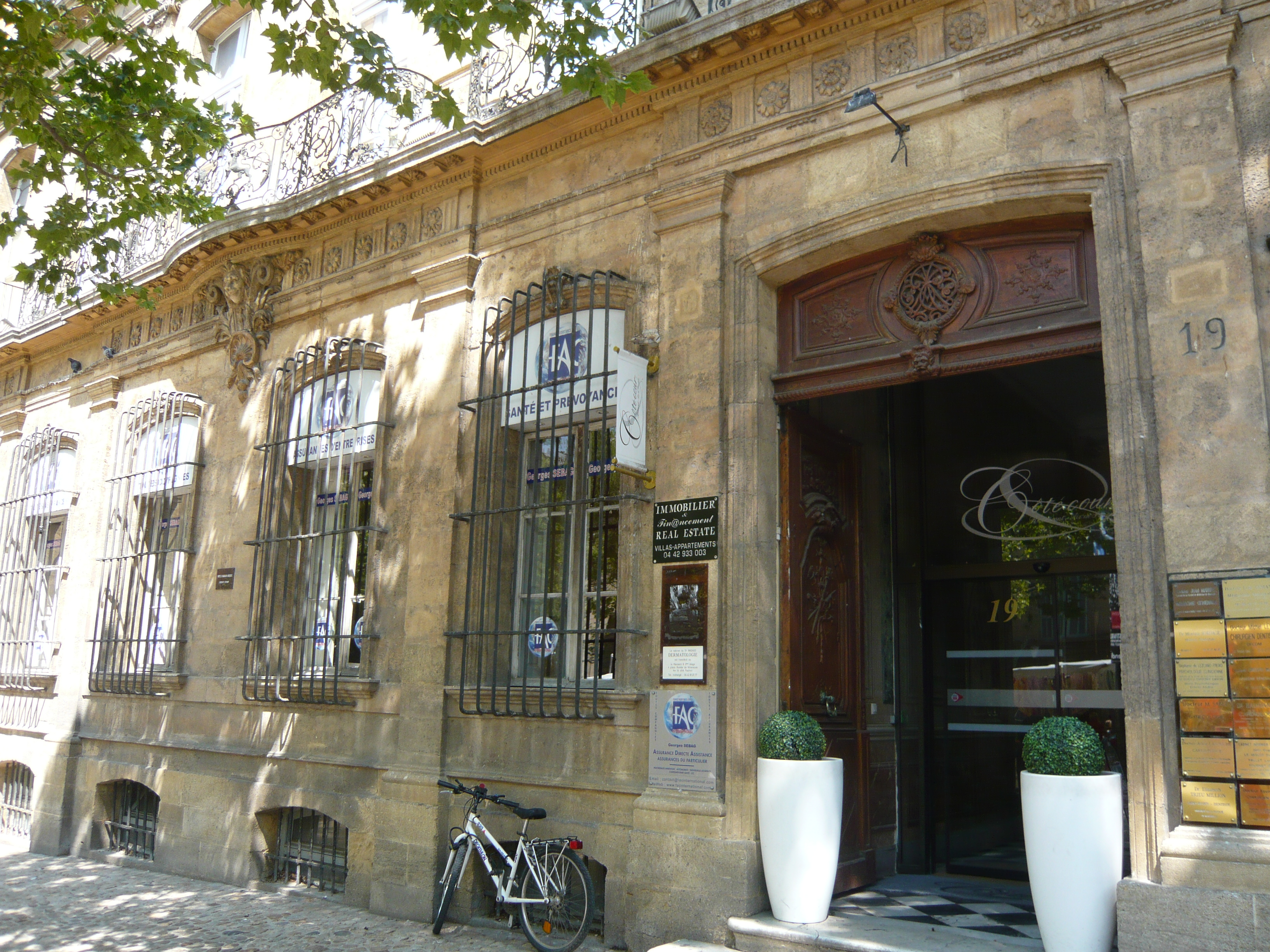
- Interactive map of the Hôtel d'Arbaud-Jouques area

General information
- Type: Hôtel particulier
- Location: 19, Cours Mirabeau, Aix-en-Provence, France
- Completed: 1732

Design and construction
- Architect: Jean-Baptiste Franque

The Hôtel d'Arbaud-Jouques is a listed hôtel particulier in Aix-en-Provence.

== Location ==
It is located at 19, Cours Mirabeau in Aix-en-Provence.

== History ==
The widow of Jacques Arbaud purchased the left-side Hôtel de Valbelle-Meyrargues in 1695 and her son André-Elzéard d'Arbaud de Jouques (1676–1744) purchased the right-side Hôtel de Séguiran some time later. They were converted in one hôtel particulier in 1732: the hôtel d'Arbaud-Jouques by the architect Jean-Baptiste Franque (1683–1758). His son Joseph Charles André d'Arbaud de Jouques (1769–1849) and his brother also lived here.

King Charles IV of Spain (1748–1819) stayed here as a guest in 1812.

== Heritage significance ==
It has been listed as a monument historique since 1990.
