= Meyrargues =

Commune in Provence-Alpes-Côte d'Azur, France

- Commune
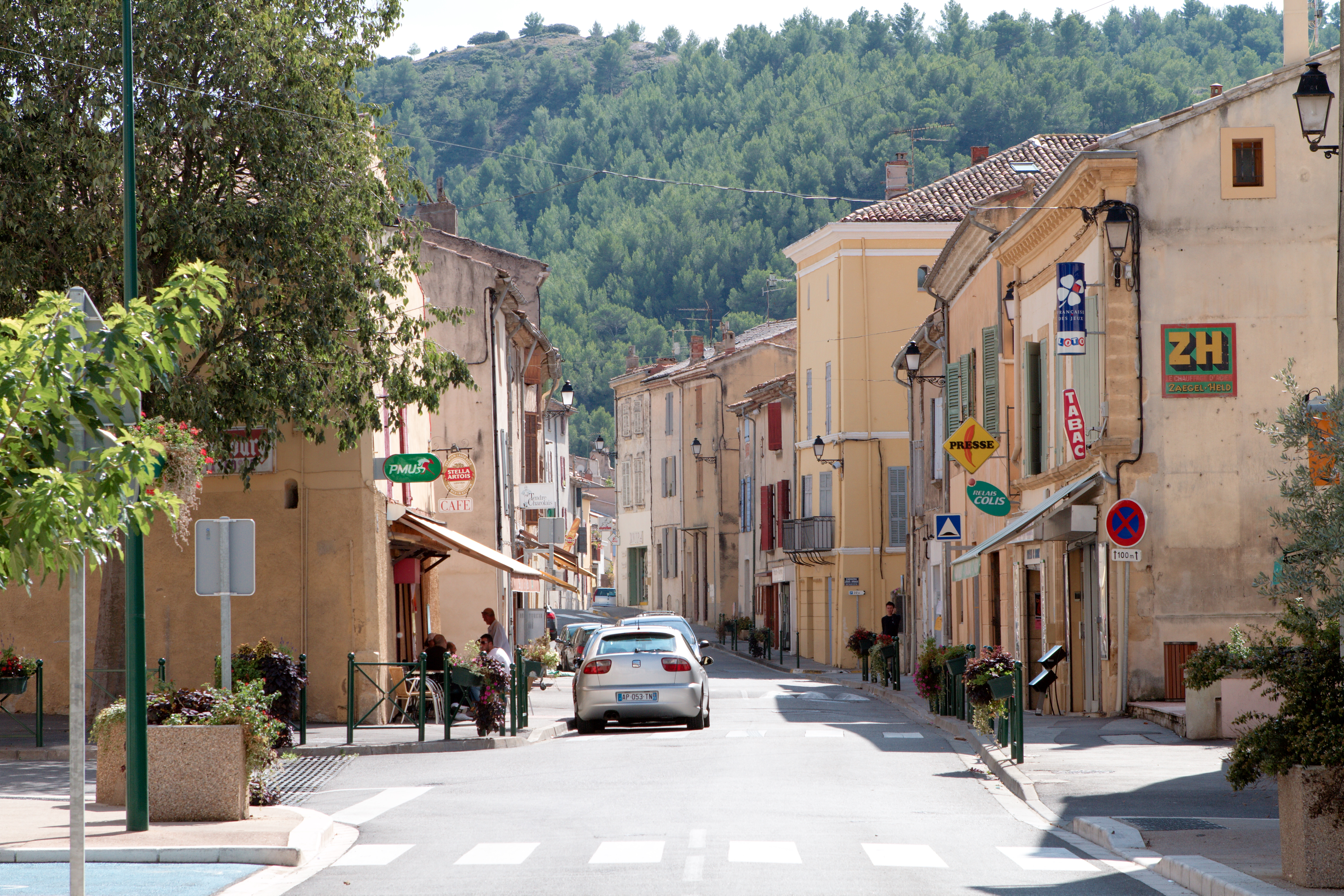
- The main street of Meyrargues

- Coat of arms
- Location of Meyrargues
- Location within France Location within Provence-Alpes-Côte d'Azur
- Coordinates: 43°38′11″N 5°31′45″E
- Country: France
- Region: Provence-Alpes-Côte d'Azur
- Department: Bouches-du-Rhône
- Arrondissement: Aix-en-Provence
- Canton: Trets
- Intercommunality: Aix-Marseille-Provence

Government
  - Mayor (2026–32): Fabrice Poussardin
- Area^{1}: 41.67 km^{2} (16.09 sq mi)
- Elevation: 206 m (676 ft)
- Highest elevation: 554 m (1,818 ft)
- Lowest elevation: 186 m (610 ft)
- Population (2023): 3,847
  - Density: 92.32/km^{2} (239.1/sq mi)
- Time zone: UTC+01:00 (CET)
  - Summer (DST): UTC+02:00 (CEST)
- INSEE/Postal code: 13059 /13650
- ^{1} French Land Register data, which excludes lakes, ponds, glaciers > 1 km^{2} (0.386 sq mi or 247 acres) and river estuaries.

Meyrargues (French pronunciation: [meʁaʁg]; Occitan: Mairarga) is a commune in the Bouches-du-Rhône department in southern France.

== Population ==
Historical population

Year	Pop.	±% p.a.
1793	892	—
1800	829	−1.04%
1806	929	+1.92%
1821	962	+0.23%
1831	1,009	+0.48%
1836	1,030	+0.41%
1841	1,035	+0.10%
1846	1,125	+1.68%
1851	1,098	−0.48%
1856	1,020	−1.46%
1861	1,143	+2.30%
1866	1,354	+3.45%
1872	1,296	−0.73%
1876	1,117	−3.65%
1881	967	−2.84%
1886	880	−1.87%
1891	939	+1.31%
1896	1,005	+1.37%
1901	1,021	+0.32%

Year	Pop.	±% p.a.
1906	953	−1.37%
1911	853	−2.19%
1921	772	−0.99%
1926	826	+1.36%
1931	879	+1.25%
1936	810	−1.62%
1946	935	+1.45%
1954	1,020	+1.09%
1962	1,525	+5.16%
1968	2,196	+6.27%
1975	2,222	+0.17%
1982	2,406	+1.14%
1990	2,814	+1.98%
1999	3,282	+1.72%
2007	3,480	+0.73%
2012	3,704	+1.26%
2017	3,804	+0.53%
2023	3,847	+0.19%

Source: EHESS and INSEE (1968-2023)

== Personalities ==
- Writer Joseph d'Arbaud was born in Meyrargues.
- Raouia Rouabhia - Algerian international volleyball player

== See also ==
- Communes of the Bouches-du-Rhône department
