= Joseph d'Arbaud =

French poet

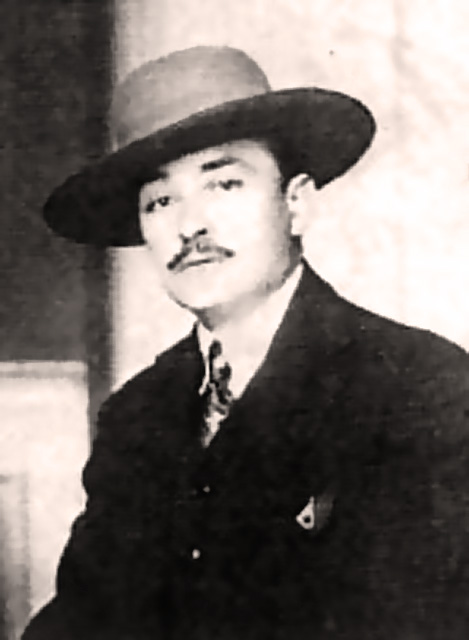
- Born: 4 October 1874; Meyrargues, Bouches-du-Rhône, Provence-Alpes-Côte d'Azur, France
- Died: 2 March 1950 (aged 75); Aix-en-Provence, Bouches-du-Rhône, Provence-Alpes-Côte d'Azur, France
- Occupation: Poet
- Parent(s): Philippe d'Arbaud; Marie-Louise Valère-Martin

Joseph d'Arbaud (4 October 1874 – 2 March 1950) was a French poet and writer from Provence. He was a leading figure in the Provençal Revival, a literary movement of the nineteenth century.

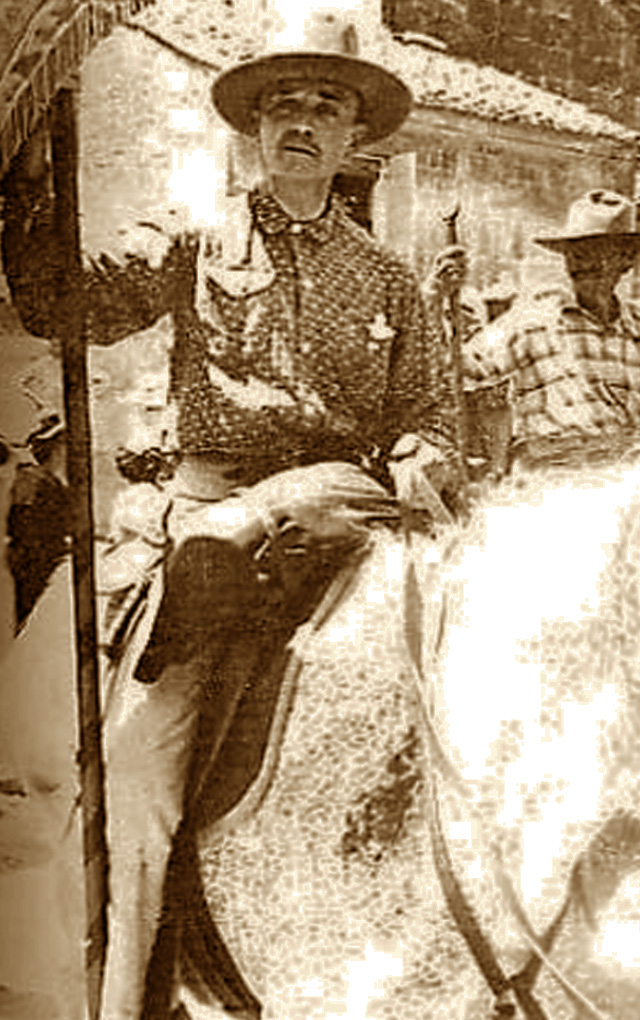
Joseph d'Arbaud in 1935

== Biography ==
=== Early life ===
Joseph d'Arbaud was born in an aristocratic family in Meyrargues on 4 October 1874. His father was Philippe d'Arbaud and his mother, Marie-Louise Valère-Martin. He was educated by Jesuits in Avignon, then studied the Law in Aix-en-Provence.

=== Career ===
After spending a few years with young writers from Aix-en-Provence, he left for Camargue and became a bull-herder. In 1918, he became a chief figure in Félibrige, a literary and cultural association founded by Frédéric Mistral (1830–1914) and other Provençal writers to defend and promote Langue d'oc languages and literatures. Le Monde referred to d'Arbaud as Mistral's fils spirituel (spiritual son).

D'Arbaud wrote in Provençal and translated his own works into French. Mistral penned a foreword to d'Arbaud's 1913 collection of poems Le Laurier d'Arles. Together with Emile Sicard, d'Arbaud also edited a local literary magazine titled Le Feu.

=== Death ===
He died in Aix-en-Provence on 2 March 1950.

== Bibliography ==
- La bête du Vaccarès
- The Beast, and Other Tales, Northwestern University Press, 2020.
