= Coulans-sur-Gée =

- Commune
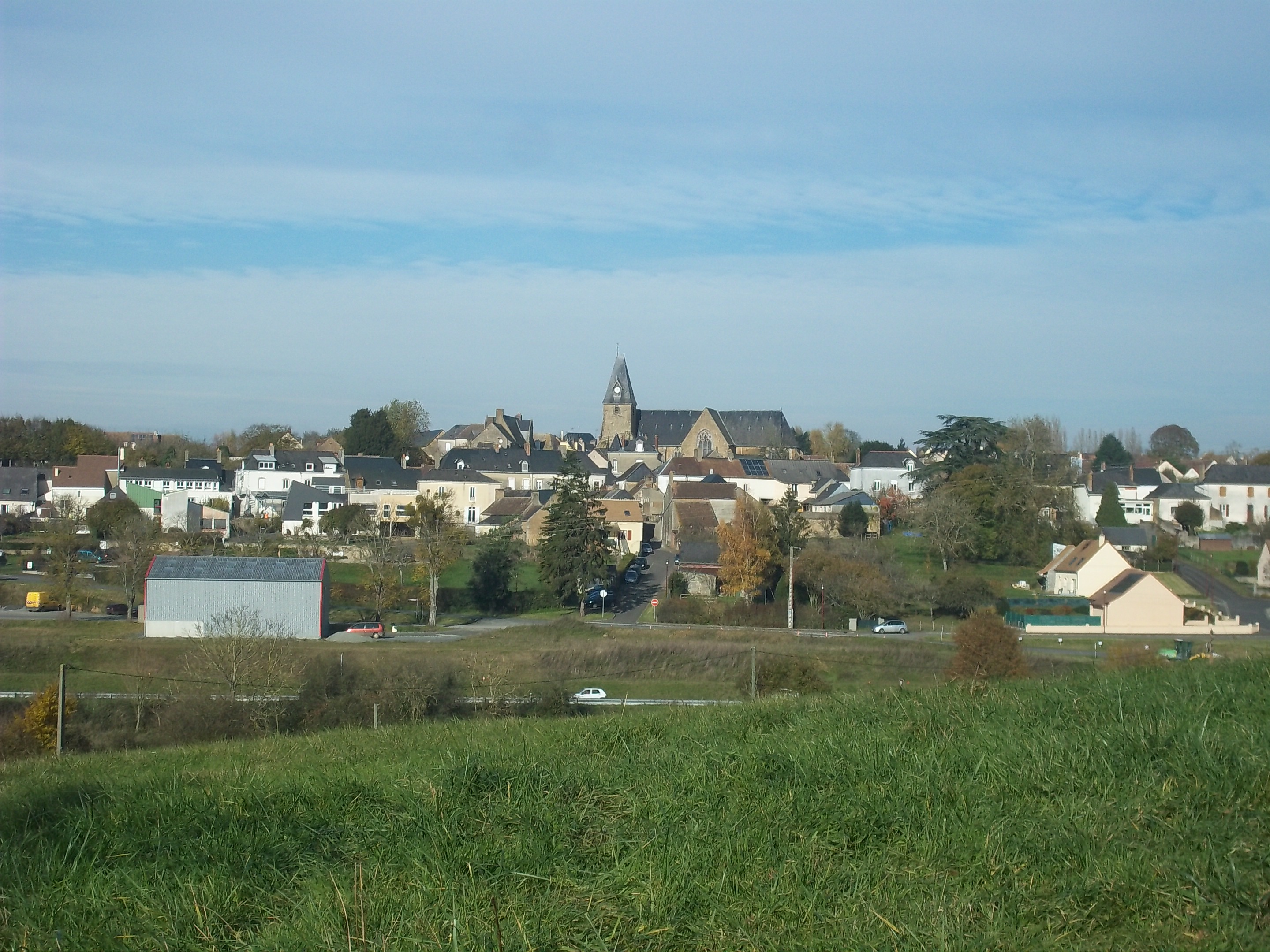
- General view
- Location of Coulans-sur-Gée
- Location within France Location within Pays de la Loire
- Coordinates: 48°01′10″N 0°00′33″E
- Country: France
- Region: Pays de la Loire
- Department: Sarthe
- Arrondissement: La Flèche
- Canton: Loué
- Intercommunality: Loué - Brûlon - Noyen

Government
  - Mayor (2020–2026): Michel Briffault
- Area^{1}: 27.48 km^{2} (10.61 sq mi)
- Population (2023): 1,605
  - Density: 58.41/km^{2} (151.3/sq mi)
- Demonym(s): Coulanais, Coulanaise
- Time zone: UTC+01:00 (CET)
  - Summer (DST): UTC+02:00 (CEST)
- INSEE/Postal code: 72096 /72550
- ^{1} French Land Register data, which excludes lakes, ponds, glaciers > 1 km^{2} (0.386 sq mi or 247 acres) and river estuaries.

Coulans-sur-Gée is a commune in the Sarthe department in the Pays de la Loire region in north-western France.

== See also ==
- Communes of the Sarthe department
