= Mison =

- Commune
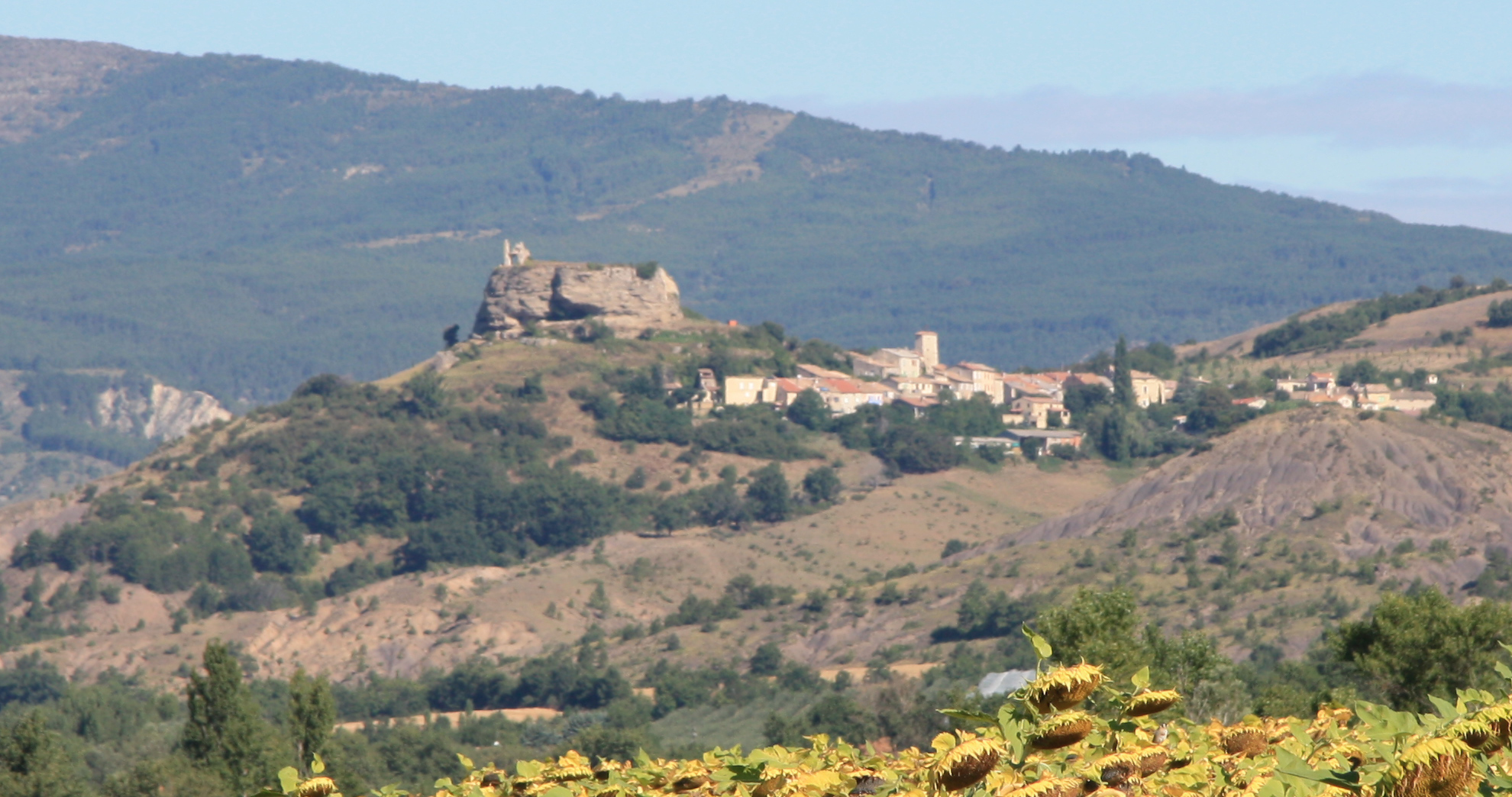
- A general view of the village of Mison and the castle

- Coat of arms
- Location of Mison
- Location within France Location within Provence-Alpes-Côte d'Azur
- Coordinates: 44°15′56″N 5°50′54″E
- Country: France
- Region: Provence-Alpes-Côte d'Azur
- Department: Alpes-de-Haute-Provence
- Arrondissement: Forcalquier
- Canton: Sisteron
- Intercommunality: Sisteronais Buëch

Government
  - Mayor (2026–32): Robert Gay
- Area^{1}: 31.72 km^{2} (12.25 sq mi)
- Elevation: 610 m (2,000 ft)
- Highest elevation: 735 m (2,411 ft)
- Lowest elevation: 489 m (1,604 ft)
- Population (2023): 1,112
  - Density: 35.06/km^{2} (90.80/sq mi)
- Time zone: UTC+01:00 (CET)
  - Summer (DST): UTC+02:00 (CEST)
- INSEE/Postal code: 04123 /04200
- ^{1} French Land Register data, which excludes lakes, ponds, glaciers > 1 km^{2} (0.386 sq mi or 247 acres) and river estuaries.

Mison (French pronunciation: [mizɔ̃]) is a commune in the Alpes-de-Haute-Provence department in southeastern France.

At the top of the hill in the village are the remains of a 13th-century castle built by the Mérvouillon family. The building is organised around a central courtyard and the four main buildings are flanked by square towers. There are two gates. The castle was abandoned by the end of the 18th century. Restorations have been undertaken since 2005.

== Population ==
Historical population
| Year | Pop. | ±% p.a. |
|---|---|---|
| 1968 | 511 | — |
| 1975 | 566 | +1.47% |
| 1982 | 579 | +0.32% |
| 1990 | 764 | +3.53% |
| 1999 | 849 | +1.18% |
| 2007 | 976 | +1.76% |
| 2012 | 1,045 | +1.38% |
| 2017 | 1,128 | +1.54% |
| 2023 | 1,112 | −0.24% |
Source: INSEE

== See also ==
- Communes of the Alpes-de-Haute-Provence department
