= Jean-Baptiste Franque =

French architect

Jean-Baptiste Franque (Villeneuve-lès-Avignon, Languedoc February 1, 1683 - Avignon, March 26, 1758) was a French architect. He was the father of François II Franque and Jean-Pierre Franque, also architects, and therefore the father-in-law of the architect Esprit-Joseph Brun.

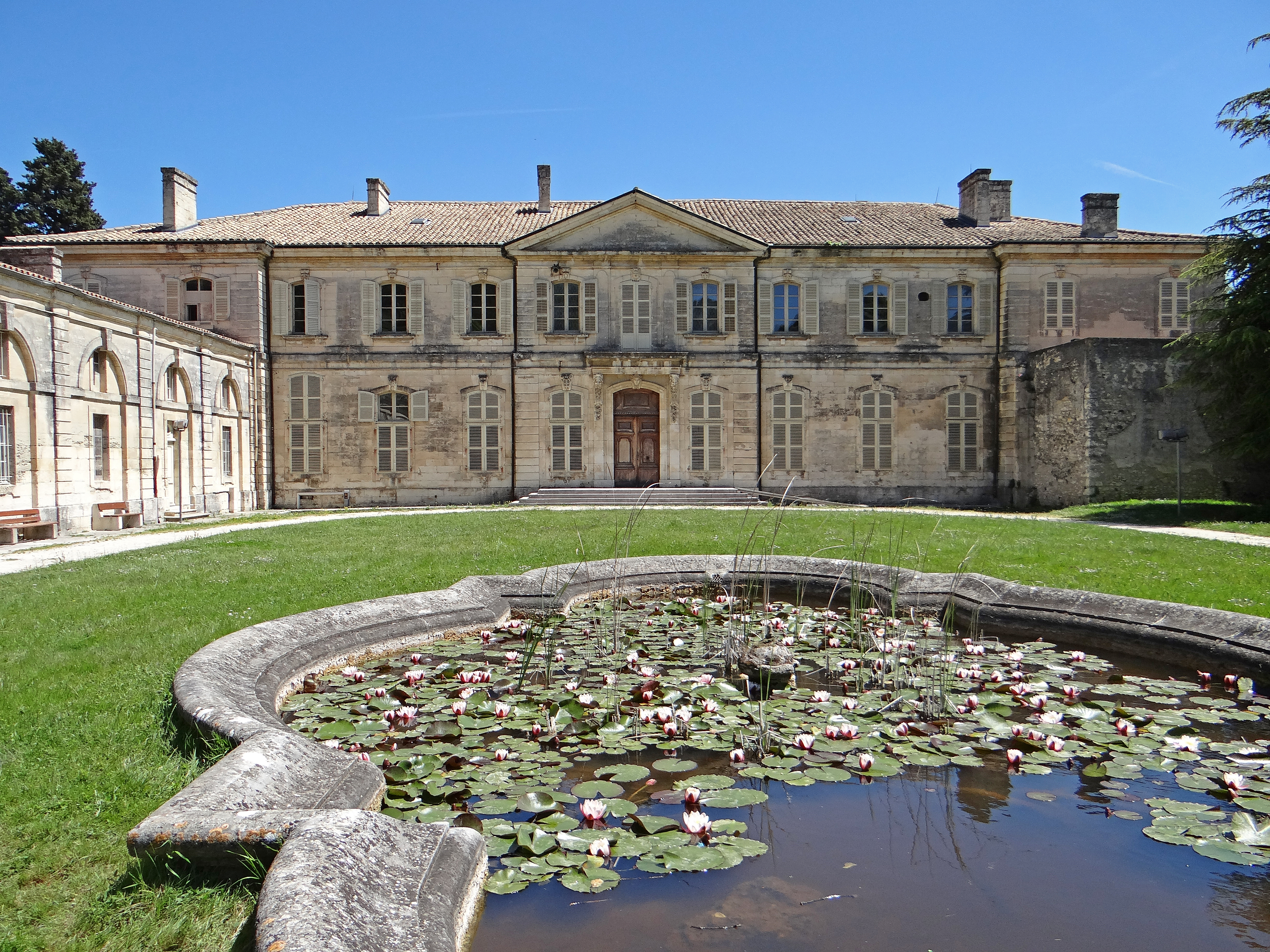
Former Episcopal Palace of Viviers (today's town hall)

== Biography ==
Born in Villeneuve-lès-Avignon, he was the son of a master mason and took over his father's workshop before settling in Avignon, where he became an architect around 1715. He probably trained with the great Avignon architects of the previous generation, Pierre II Mignard and Jean Péru.

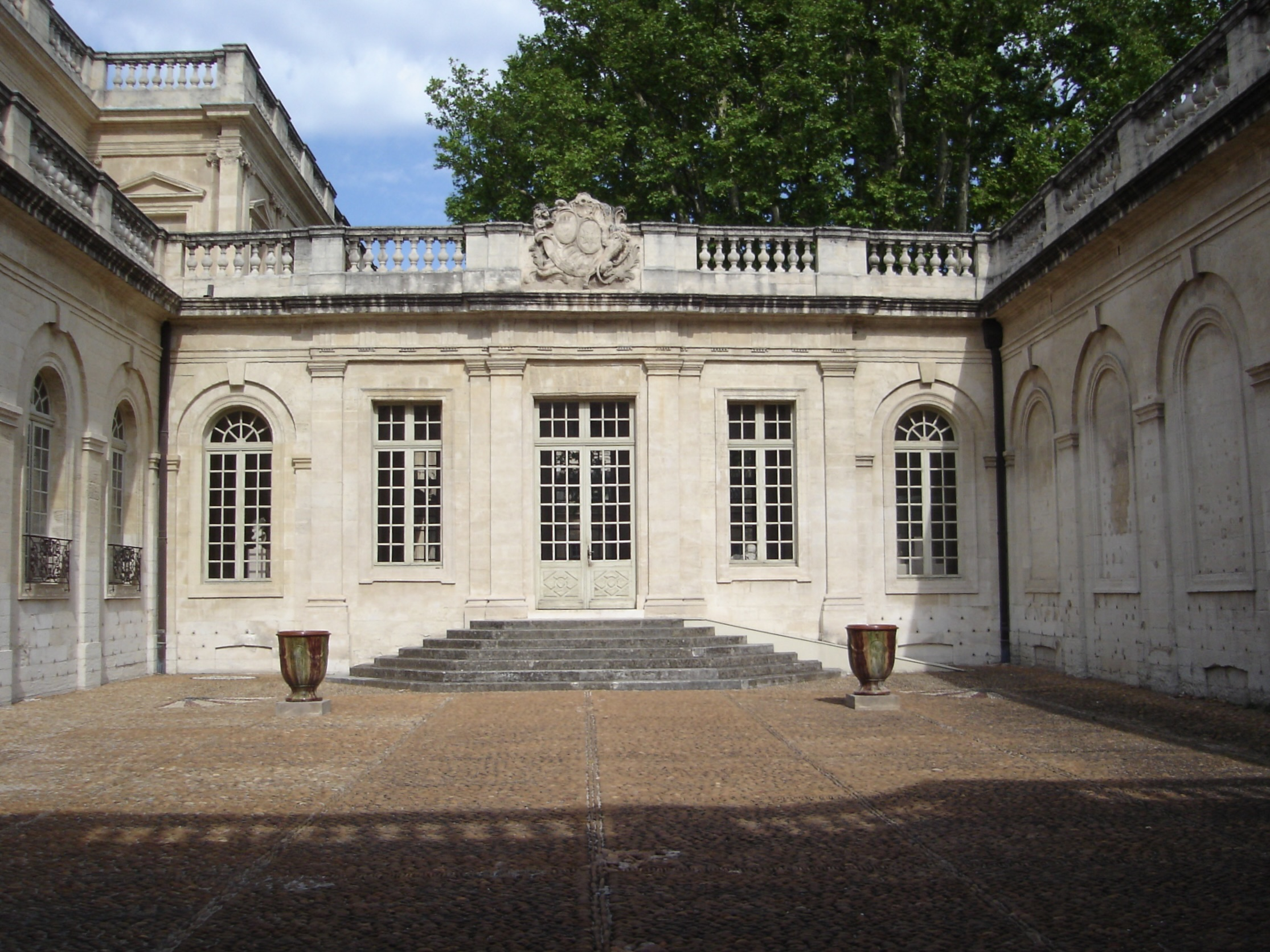
The Calvet museum in the palace of Villeneuve-Martignan

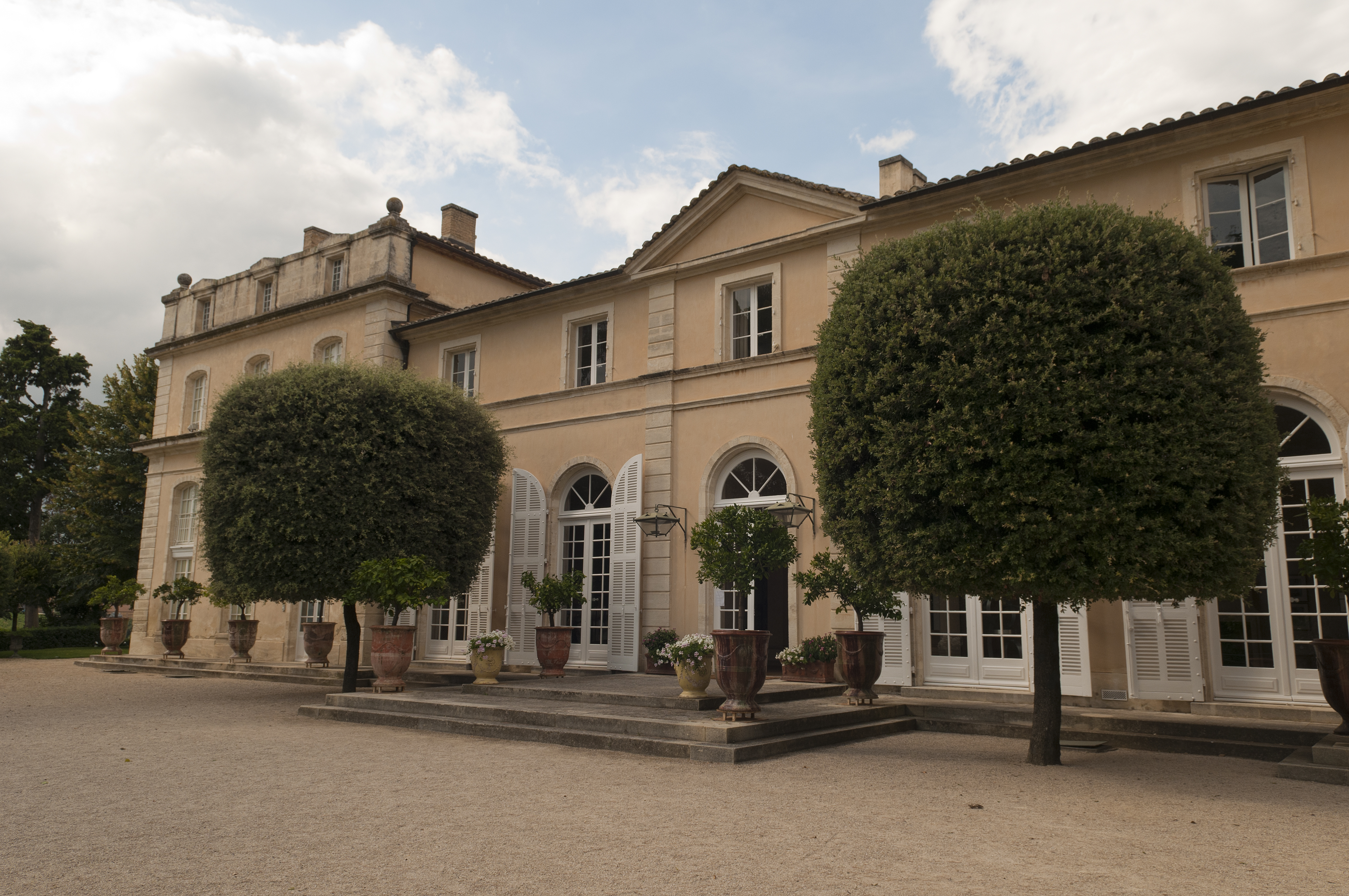
Château la Nerthe, a Châteauneuf-du-Pape

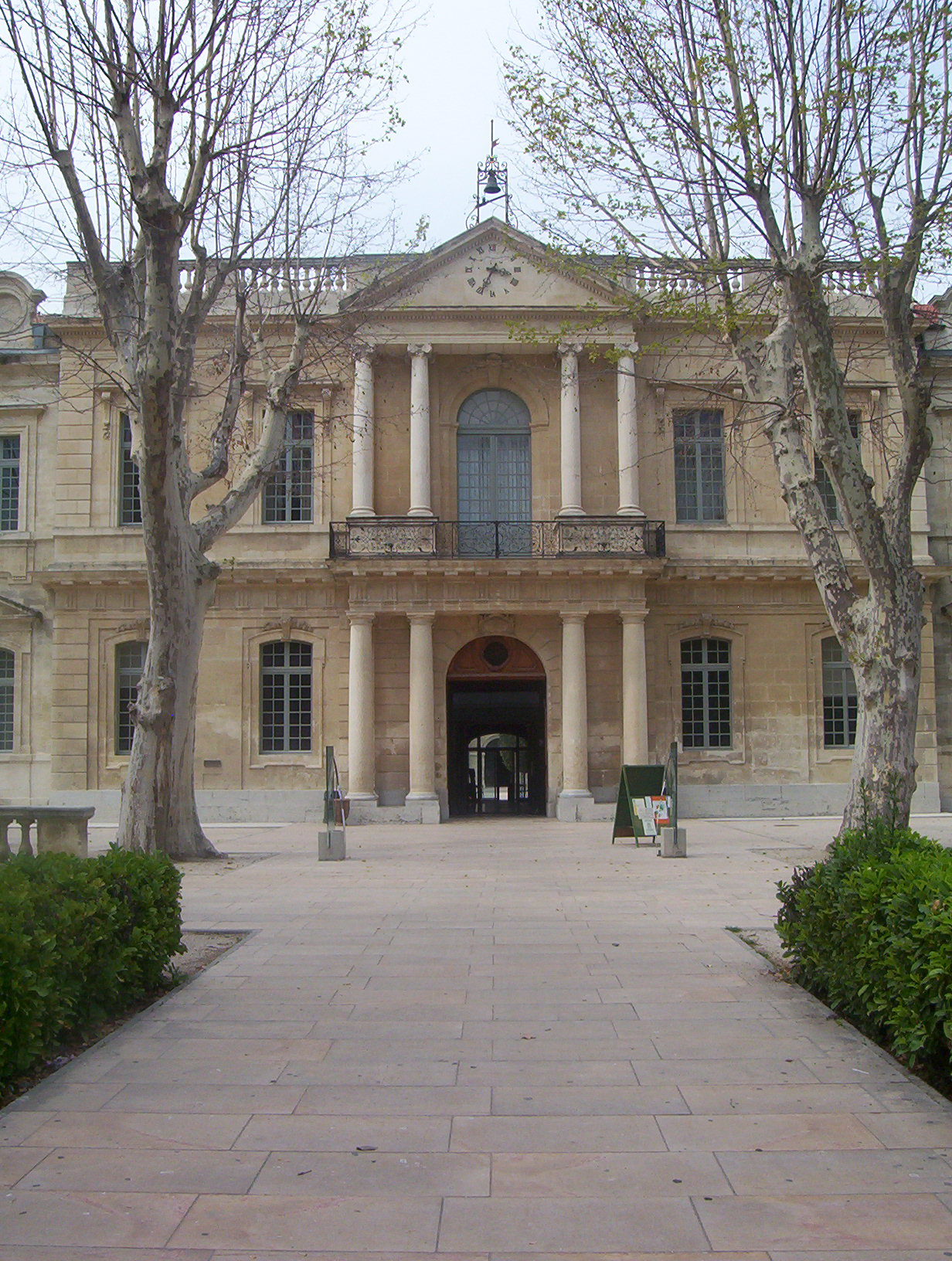
Façade of the former Santa Marta Hospital, now Avignon University

He worked under the supervision of two of his sons, François II and Jean-Pierre, mainly in the south of France, from Toulon to Carcassonne, passing through Viviers where they made the vaults of the cathedral.

Jean-Baptiste remains the best known of this family of Avignon architects. Towards the 1740s, his personal works became difficult to distinguish from those carried out in collaboration with his sons. Thus, François, who had attended the French School in Rome and was a member of the Royal Academy of Architecture in Paris, was the co-author of the palace of Villeneuve-Martignan (today's Musée Calvet), the palace of Caumont, the church of Notre-Dame des Pommiers in Beaucaire and the central portal of the Saint Martha's hospital, which is now the seat of the University of Avignon. His younger brother Jean-Pierre, followed his father's local work and was still active during the French Revolution.

In Avignon you can admire the Saint-Charles chapel (created by Jean-Baptiste in collaboration with his son François), the butchers and fishmongers of the rue du Vieux-Sextier (with his son Jean-Pierre), a part of the Aumône Générale. In Châteauneuf-du-Pape, it conceives the castle la Nerthe, historical place of the wine appellation; the castle was finished by François after his death.

In Viviers, he realized the episcopal palace and the palaces de Roqueplane, de Beaulieu and de Tourville. At Beaucaire, he built the palace de Linage. He died in March 1758, but his work was continued, such as the facade of the church of Richerenches which is finished building in 1765 following his plans.

Jean-Baptiste Franque marked the regional architecture, realizing the synthesis between the local tradition with Italian tendency, of which Jean Péru was the continuator, and the French classicism, established in Avignon by Pierre II Mignard. Franque's domination and knowledge of stereotomy allowed him to cover a large number of works with daring vaults, with an inventive structure; he also tried to create suspended staircases, whose supporting structure were the steps themselves, but the technique would be perfected only half a century later by Victor Louis.

== Bibliography ==
- C.F.J. Barjavel (1841). Dictionnaire historique, biographique et bibliographique du département de Vaucluse (in French). Vol. tomi I e II. Carpentras.
- H. Chobaut (1932). Études biographiques sur les Franque et les Brun, architectes. Mémoires de l'Académie de Vaucluse (in French). Avignone.
