= Jouques =

Commune in Provence-Alpes-Côte d'Azur, France

- Commune
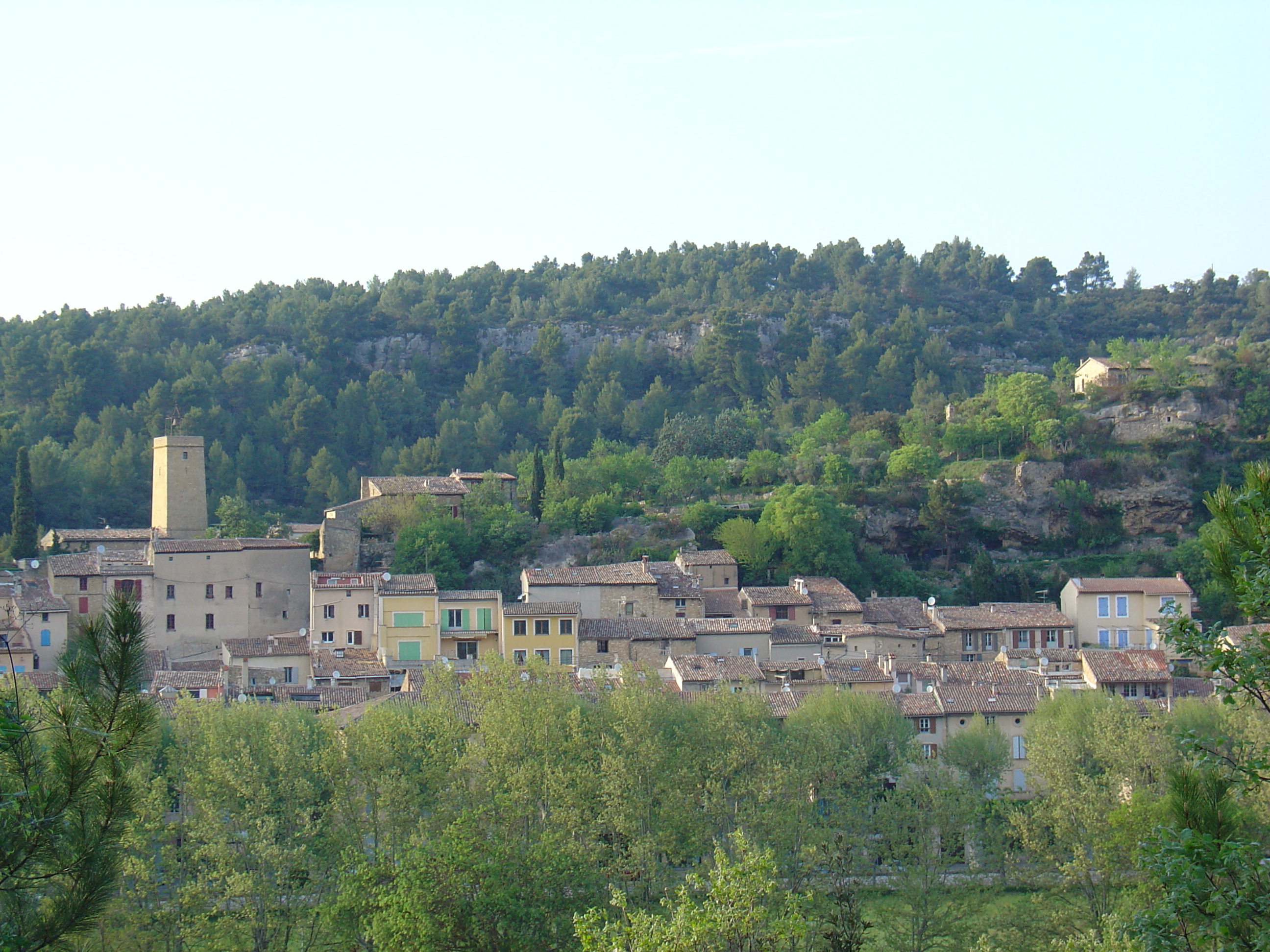
- A view of Jouques

- Coat of arms
- Location of Jouques
- Location within France Location within Provence-Alpes-Côte d'Azur
- Coordinates: 43°38′16″N 5°38′15″E
- Country: France
- Region: Provence-Alpes-Côte d'Azur
- Department: Bouches-du-Rhône
- Arrondissement: Aix-en-Provence
- Canton: Trets
- Intercommunality: Aix-Marseille-Provence

Government
  - Mayor (2026–32): Eric Garcin
- Area^{1}: 80.35 km^{2} (31.02 sq mi)
- Elevation: 363 m (1,191 ft)
- Highest elevation: 782 m (2,566 ft)
- Lowest elevation: 209 m (686 ft)
- Population (2023): 4,547
  - Density: 56.59/km^{2} (146.6/sq mi)
- Time zone: UTC+01:00 (CET)
  - Summer (DST): UTC+02:00 (CEST)
- INSEE/Postal code: 13048 /13490
- ^{1} French Land Register data, which excludes lakes, ponds, glaciers > 1 km^{2} (0.386 sq mi or 247 acres) and river estuaries.

Jouques (French pronunciation: [ʒuk]; Occitan: Jocas) is a commune in the Bouches-du-Rhône department in southern France.

== Population ==
Historical population

Year	Pop.	±% p.a.
1793	1,700	—
1800	1,586	−0.99%
1806	1,542	−0.47%
1821	1,789	+1.00%
1831	1,832	+0.24%
1836	1,834	+0.02%
1841	1,775	−0.65%
1846	1,804	+0.32%
1851	1,827	+0.25%
1856	1,716	−1.25%
1861	1,684	−0.38%
1866	1,605	−0.96%
1872	1,493	−1.20%
1876	1,502	+0.15%
1881	1,504	+0.03%
1886	1,508	+0.05%
1891	1,506	−0.03%
1896	1,301	−2.88%
1901	1,344	+0.65%

Year	Pop.	±% p.a.
1906	1,218	−1.95%
1911	1,130	−1.49%
1921	1,081	−0.44%
1926	1,022	−1.12%
1931	1,027	+0.10%
1936	934	−1.88%
1946	1,003	+0.72%
1954	1,004	+0.01%
1962	1,831	+7.80%
1968	2,047	+1.88%
1975	2,096	+0.34%
1982	2,238	+0.94%
1990	3,062	+4.00%
1999	3,321	+0.91%
2007	4,007	+2.37%
2012	4,257	+1.22%
2017	4,413	+0.72%
2023	4,547	+0.50%

Source: EHESS and INSEE (1968-2023)

== See also ==
- Communes of the Bouches-du-Rhône department
- Antoine Sartorio
