= Rheinzabern =

- Municipality
- Coat of arms

- Location of Rheinzabern within Germersheim district
- Interactive map of Rheinzabern
- Location within Germany Location within Rhineland-Palatinate
- Coordinates: 49°7′10″N 8°16′46″E
- Country: Germany
- State: Rhineland-Palatinate
- District: Germersheim
- Municipal assoc.: Jockgrim

Government
  - Mayor (2024–29): Sabrina Welker (Ind.)

Area
  - Total: 12.77 km^{2} (4.93 sq mi)
- Elevation: 113 m (371 ft)

Population (2025-12-31)
  - Total: 4,958
  - Density: 388.3/km^{2} (1,006/sq mi)
- Time zone: UTC+01:00 (CET)
  - Summer (DST): UTC+02:00 (CEST)
- Postal codes: 76764
- Dialling codes: 07272
- Vehicle registration: GER
- Website: rheinzabern.com

Rheinzabern is a small town in the south-east of Rhineland-Palatinate in Germany near the Rhine river. Currently, Rheinzabern, that belongs to the District of Germersheim has approx. 5000 inhabitants living on an area of 12,75 square kilometres.

== Rhenanae Tabernae ==
The Latin term "Rhenanae Tabernae" literally means "tavern" and "Rhine". Hence Rheinzabern was founded as a place of rest for travellers on Roman roads. Founded some 1950 years ago as "Rhenanae Tabernae" along a Roman road, it is known for its Samian ware production. Remnants of the production are still visible and there is a local museum dedicated to pottery and Roman culture.

Impressions of Rheinzabern
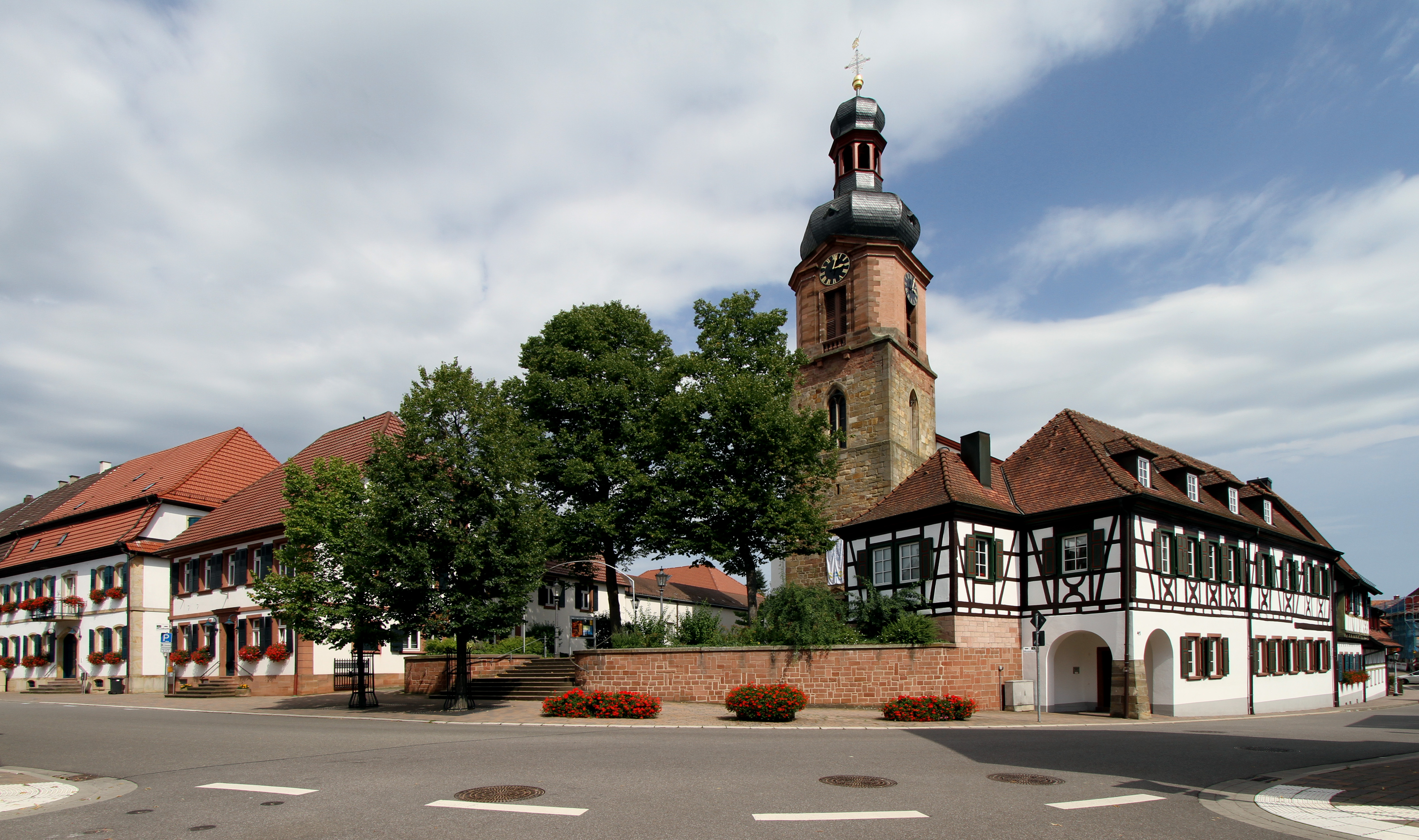
Historic village centre with parish church of St. Michael

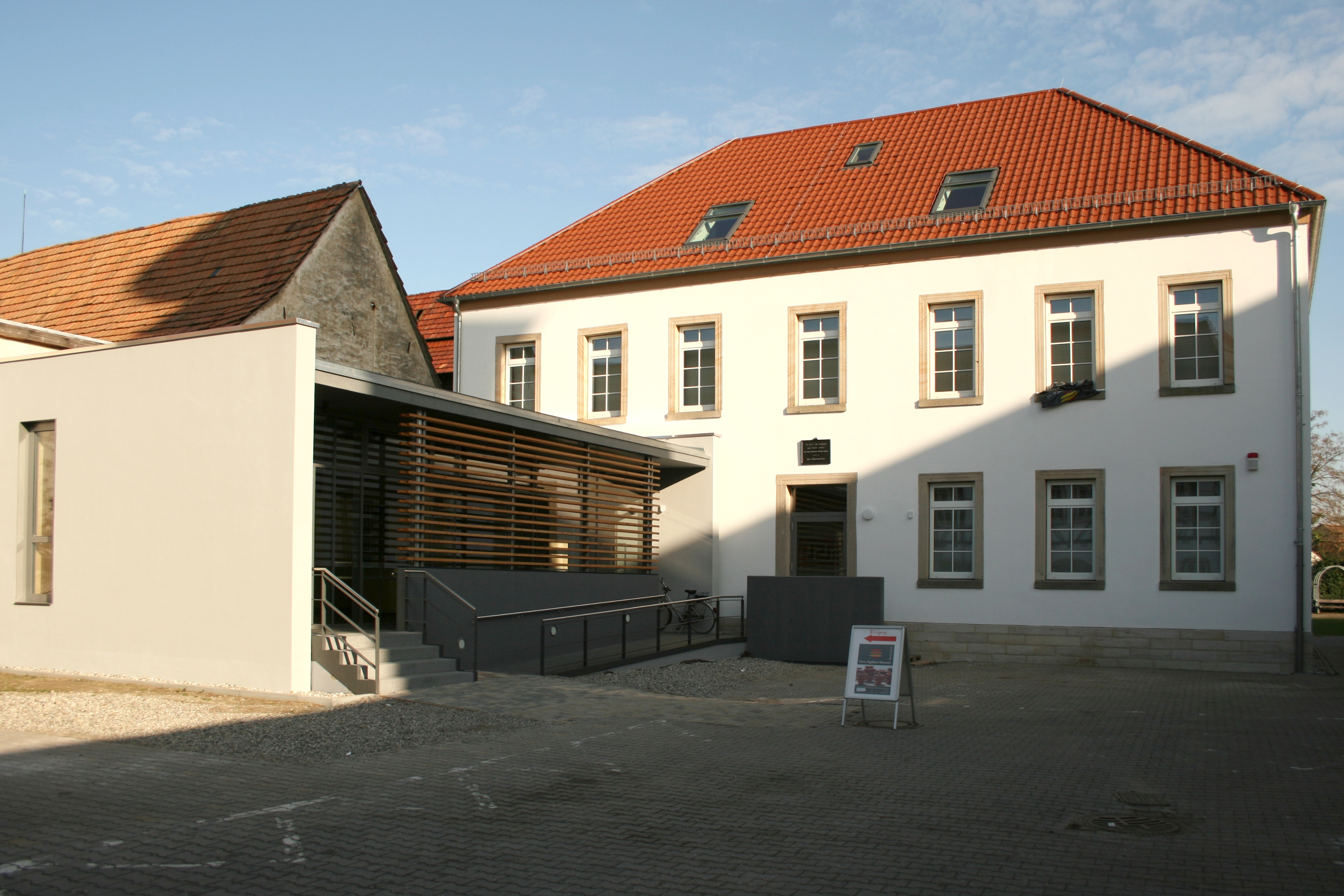
Terra Sigillata Museum

== Economy and infrastructure ==
=== Economy ===
The village has a rural character and has been agricultural for a long time. Rheinzabern now presents itself as a residential community in the vicinity of the large economic areas of Rhine-Neckar and Karlsruhe. Rheinzabern has a solid infrastructure with many craft and agricultural businesses.

=== Traffic ===
The village can be reached from the east via the Bundesstraße 9 and from the west, the connection via the A 65 motorway is the "Kandel-Mitte" exit.
Rheinzabern station is on Schifferstadt–Wörth railway and is served by the Karlsruhe Stadtbahn.

== Partnership of cities ==
A partnership is maintained with the five French communes of Chalmoux, Cronat, Mont, Saint-Aubin-sur-Loire and Vitry-sur-Loire (Communauté de communes entre Somme et Loire) in Burgundy.

== Notable citizens ==
- Paul Fagius (1504–1549), reformer
- Philipp von Pfeiffer (1830–1908), capitular in Speyer
- Maximilian Josef Pfeiffer (1875–1926), politician
- Anton Pfeiffer (1888–1957), politician (BVP, CSU) and diplomat
- Columba Baumgartner (1912–2007), abbess
- Guido Deutschler (born 1952), successful entrepreneur
- Reiner Marz (born 1958), politician (GRÜNE)
- Hans Kantereit (1959–2021), author
- Philipp Jakob Gillmann, priest
- Elisabeth Langgässer (1899–1950), author
- Manuel Hornig (born 18 December 1982), soccer player
- Barbara Schleicher-Rothmund (born 14 February 1959), politician
- Florian Bauer (born 28 April 1982), musician
- Thomas Gebhart (born 1971, politician)
