= Jean-Baptiste-Joseph de Coriolis de Villeneuve d'Espinouse =

French aristocrat and public official

- Born: January 30, 1655; Aix-en-Provence, Province of Provence, France
- Died: January 12, 1712 (aged 56); Espinouse
- Occupation: Public official

Jean-Baptiste-Joseph de Coriolis de Villeneuve d'Espinouse (1655–1712) was a French aristocrat and public official.

== Biography ==
=== Early life ===
Jean-Baptiste-Joseph de Coriolis de Villeneuve d'Espinouse was born in an aristocratic family on January 30, 1655, in Aix-en-Provence. His father, Pierre de Coriolis de Villeneuve d'Espinouse, served as Président à mortier of the Parlement of Aix-en-Provence in 1651, and his paternal grandfather, Honoré de Coriolis, did too in 1625, as did his paternal great-grandfather, Laurent de Coriolis de Corbières, in 1600, and his paternal great-great-grandfather, Louis de Coriolis, in 1568. His mother was named Louise d'Oraison.

=== Career ===
Following in his family footsteps, he served as Président à mortier of the Parlement of Aix-en-Provence from 1690 to 1694, after Joseph-Anne de Valbelle de Tourves (1648–1722) and before Silvy Raousset de Boulbon.

=== Personal life ===
He married Elisabeth Catherine Grimaldi. They had a son and a daughter:

- Pierre de Coriolis d'Espinouse (1677–1755). He married Félicité de Vintimille. They had a daughter and a son:
  - Françoise de Coriolis (1713–1737).
  - François Charles Xavier de Coriolis d'Espinouse (1719–1798). He married Charlotte de Roux de Courbons. They had:
    - Marie Agathe de Coriolis. She married Gilles François de Séran d'Andrieu. They had a son and a daughter:
      - Jean-Baptiste François de Séran d'Anglé.
      - Henriette Angélique de Séran d'Andrieu (1761–1825).

François Charles Xavier de Coriolis d'Espinouse remarried in 1759 to Antoinette de Montcalm-Gozon (1737–1799). They had a son:

    - Charles Louis Alexandre de Coriolis d'Espinouse (1770–1841). He married Henriette d'Estampes (1772–1837). They had a son and a daughter:
      - Charles Auguste de Coriolis d'Espinouse (1804–1871).
      - Marie Thérèse Calixte de Coriolis (died 1846).
- Madeleine de Coriolis. She married Jean Baptiste Toussaint d'Arnaud de Rousset. They had four daughters and two sons:
  - Magdeleine Félicité d'Arnaud de Rousset.
  - Marie Thérèse d'Arnaud de Rousset.
  - Louis Charles Marie d'Arnaud de Rousset. He married Marie Louise Gabrielle de Bruny. They had a son and three daughters:
    - Joseph François d'Arnaud de Rousset.
    - Marie Thérèse Adélaïde d'Arnaud de Rousset.
    - Madeleine Félicité d'Arnaud de Rousset.
    - Marguerite Sophie d'Arnaud de Rousset.
  - Pierre François d'Arnaud de Rousset.
  - Charlotte d'Arnaud de Rousset.
  - Marie Henriette d'Arnaud de Rousset.

He died on January 12, 1712, in Espinouse.
