= Jean-Augustin de Foresta =

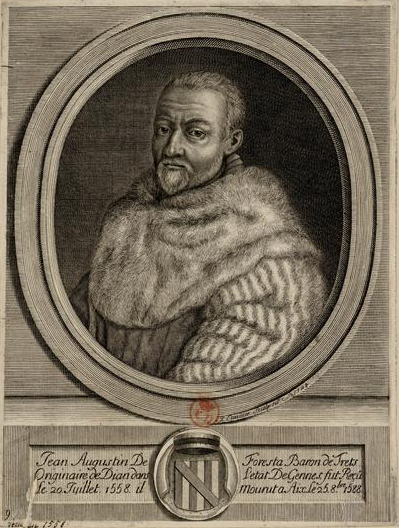
- Born: 1520
- Died: 24 October 1588 (aged 67–68); Aix-en-Provence
- Occupations: Landowner; Lawyer
- Spouse: Anne d'Albertas
- Children: Christophe II de Foresta; François de Foresta; Jean-Paul I de Foresta; Gaspard de Foresta; Amiel de Foresta
- Parent: Christophe de Foresta

Jean-Augustin de Foresta (1520-1588) was a French aristocrat, landowner and lawyer. He served as the Président à mortier of the Parlement of Aix-en-Provence in 1554, and as its First President from 1557 to 1564.

== Biography ==
=== Early life ===
Jean-Augustin de Foresta was born in 1520. His father, Christophe de Foresta, was an Advisor in the Parlement of Aix-en-Provence.

=== Career ===
He inherited the Baronetcy of Trets.

He served as the President a mortier of the Parlement of Aix-en-Provence in 1554, and then as its First President from 1557 to 1564.

=== Personal life ===
In 1553, he married Anne d'Albertas, daughter of Amiel (or Amédée) d'Albertas, Lord of Villecroze and First Consul of Marseille, and Françoise Sabateriis. They had five children:

- Christophe II de Foresta (1555-unknown). He married the Marquess de Covet de Marignane.
- François de Foresta (1557-1612). He married Marguerite de Glandeves.
- Jean-Paul I de Foresta (1564-unknown). He married Marguerite de Lenche.
- Gaspard de Foresta. He married Sibylle Bernard.
- Amiel de Foresta.

=== Death and legacy ===
He died on 24 October 1588 and was buried in the Couvent des Observantins in Aix. His grandson, Jean-Augustin Foresta de la Roquette, served as the President a mortier of the Parlement of Aix-en-Provence in 1630.
