= Alexandre Jean-Baptiste de Boyer, Marquis d'Éguilles =

Alexandre Jean-Baptiste de Boyer, Marquis d’Éguilles
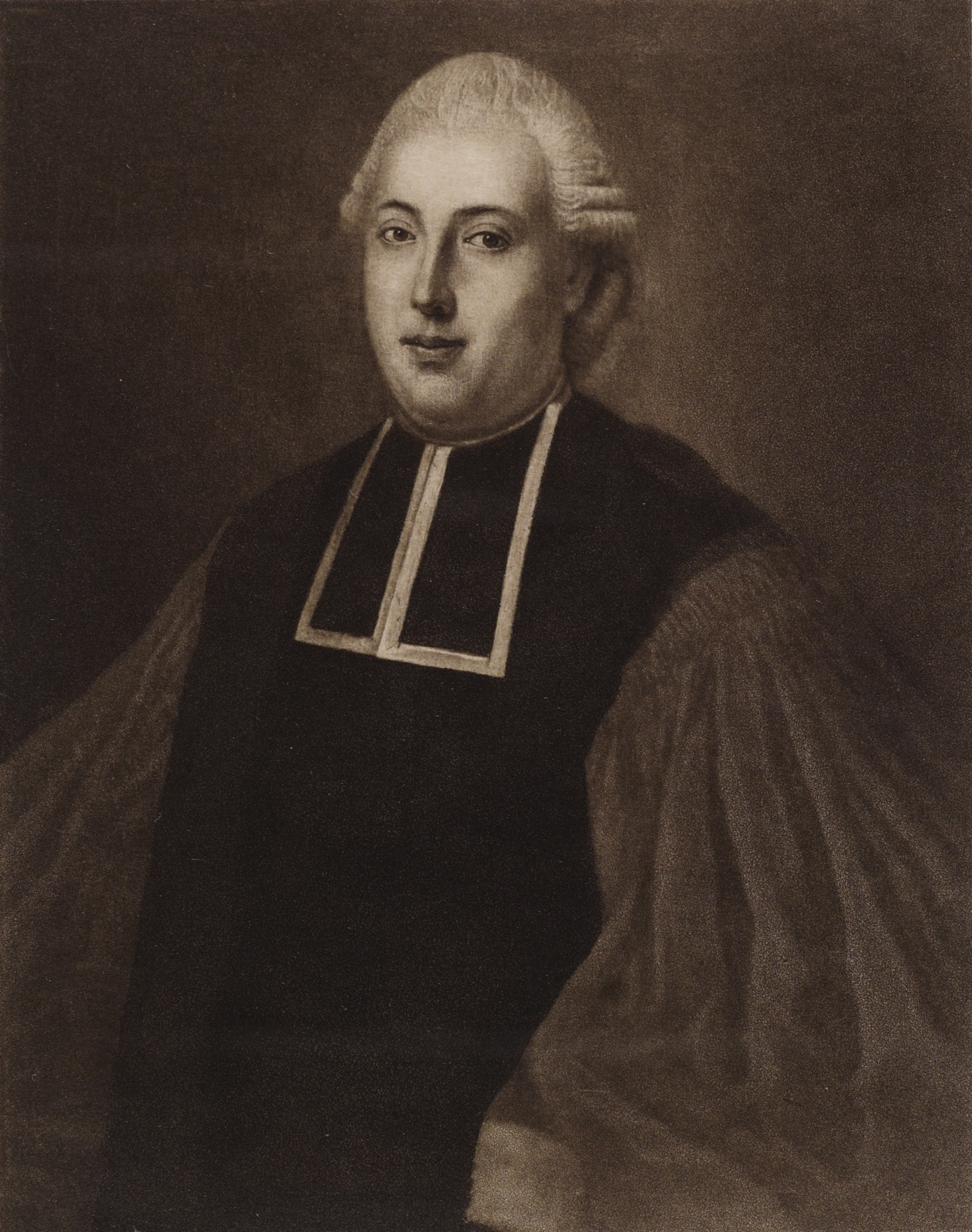
- The Marquis d’Éguilles, as Président à mortier

Président à mortier Provencal Regional Parliament
- In office 1747–1763

Personal Envoy of Louis XV to Charles Stuart
- In office September 1745 – May 1746

Personal details
- Born: 29 March 1709 Hôtel de Boyer d'Éguilles, Aix-en-Provence, France
- Died: 8 October 1783 (aged 74) Éguilles, France
- Spouse(s): Marie-Anne Rousseau (1740); Catherine Wannup (1748)
- Children: Pierre-Jean de Boyer (1753–1823); Paul-Luc de Boyer (1754–1820)
- Education: Académie de Marseille

Alexandre Jean-Baptiste de Boyer, Marquis d’Éguilles (29 March 1709 – 8 October 1783) was a French administrator who served as an unofficial envoy to Charles Edward Stuart during the 1745 Jacobite Rebellion. Taken prisoner after the Battle of Culloden in April 1746, he was released in 1747 and later held a senior legal post in the Provencal Regional Parliament. He was exiled from France in 1763 for opposing the suppression of the Jesuits but allowed to return in 1768 and died at home in March 1783.

== Life ==
Alexandre Jean-Baptiste de Boyer, later Seigneur or Marquis d’Éguilles, was born on 29 March 1709, at the family home in the southern French town of Aix-en-Provence, the Hôtel Boyer d'Éguilles. He was the third of five sons of Pierre-Jean de Boyer (died 1757) and Angélique de L'Enfant, daughter of Luc de L'Enfant (1656–1729), President of the Regional Parliament.

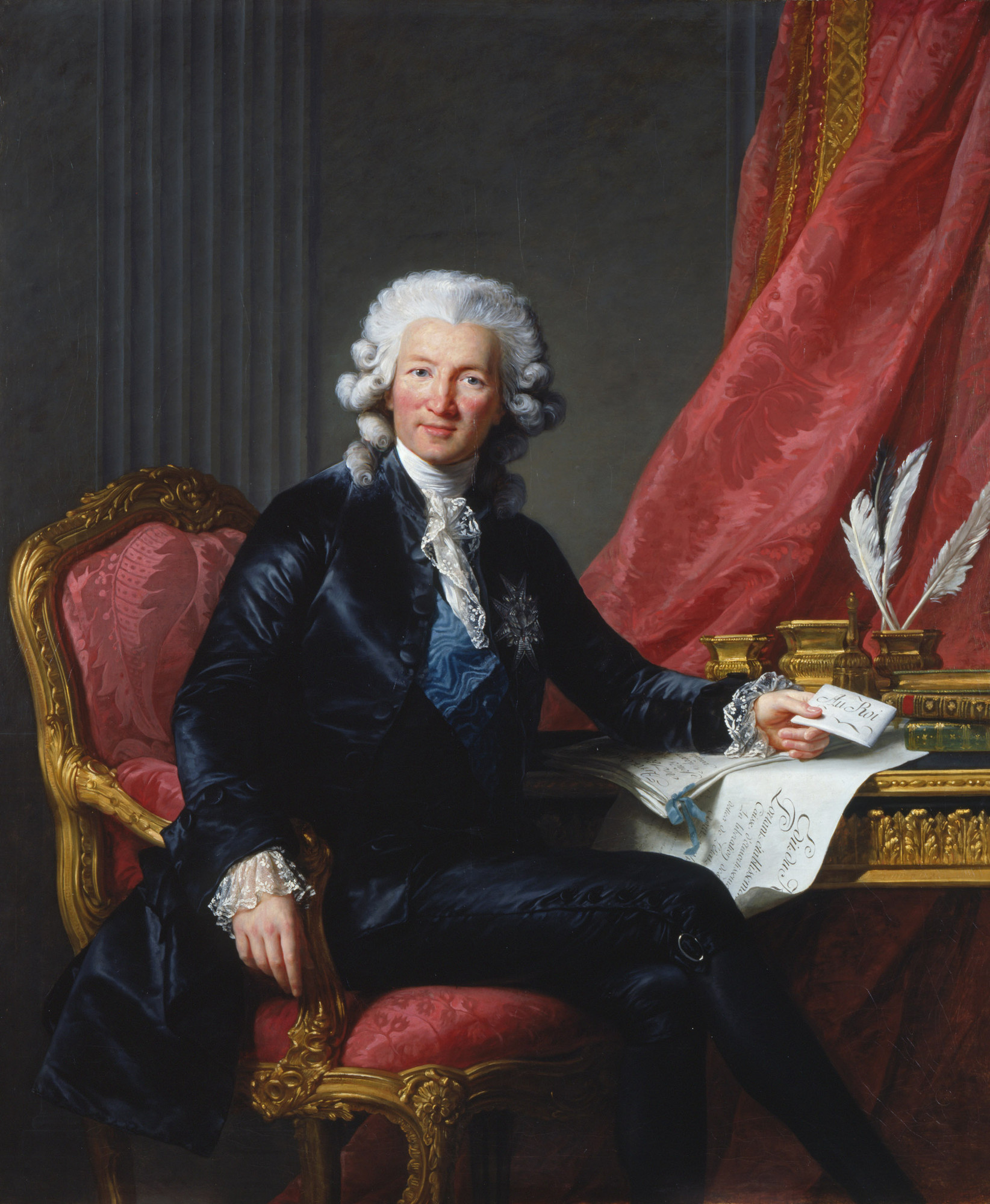
An official dressed as a Noblesse de robe; d’Éguilles came from this class

Pierre-Jean was Procureur général or Attorney-General for the Regional Parliament of Provence and a member of the Noblesse de robe or Nobles of the robe. This class formed the Second Estate whose rank derived from holding judicial or administrative posts and were often hard-working professionals, unlike the aristocratic Noblesse d'épée or Nobles of the Sword.

By the mid-18th century, many of these positions had become hereditary and eldest sons were expected to succeed their fathers, marry and have children. Instead, Alexandre's elder brother Jean-Baptiste, Marquis d'Argens, defied his father by choosing a military career. Unlike the rest of his family, who were devout Catholics, he became an atheist philosopher, writer and friend of Voltaire and later wrote 'I was not my father's favourite child.' He was formally disinherited in 1734, an act that profoundly changed the life of his younger brother but despite their philosophical differences, the two were close friends throughout their lives.

To prevent the division of family estates amongst multiple heirs, younger sons often remained unmarried; the second son Paul (1708–1785) became a priest, while Alexandre, Sextus (1710–?) and Luc (1713–1772) joined the Knights of Malta. As Paul was committed to the Church, Alexandre became 'Marquis D'Éguilles' when their father died in 1757, although Jean-Baptiste retained the title 'Marquis d'Argens'.

In May 1740, he married Marie-Anne Rousseau (1714–1741), who died in childbirth; he re-married in June 1748, this time to an English lady, Catherine Stanhope (or Wannup) (1726–1761). They had two sons who survived childhood, Pierre-Jean (1753–1823) and Paul-Luc (1754–1820).

== Career ==
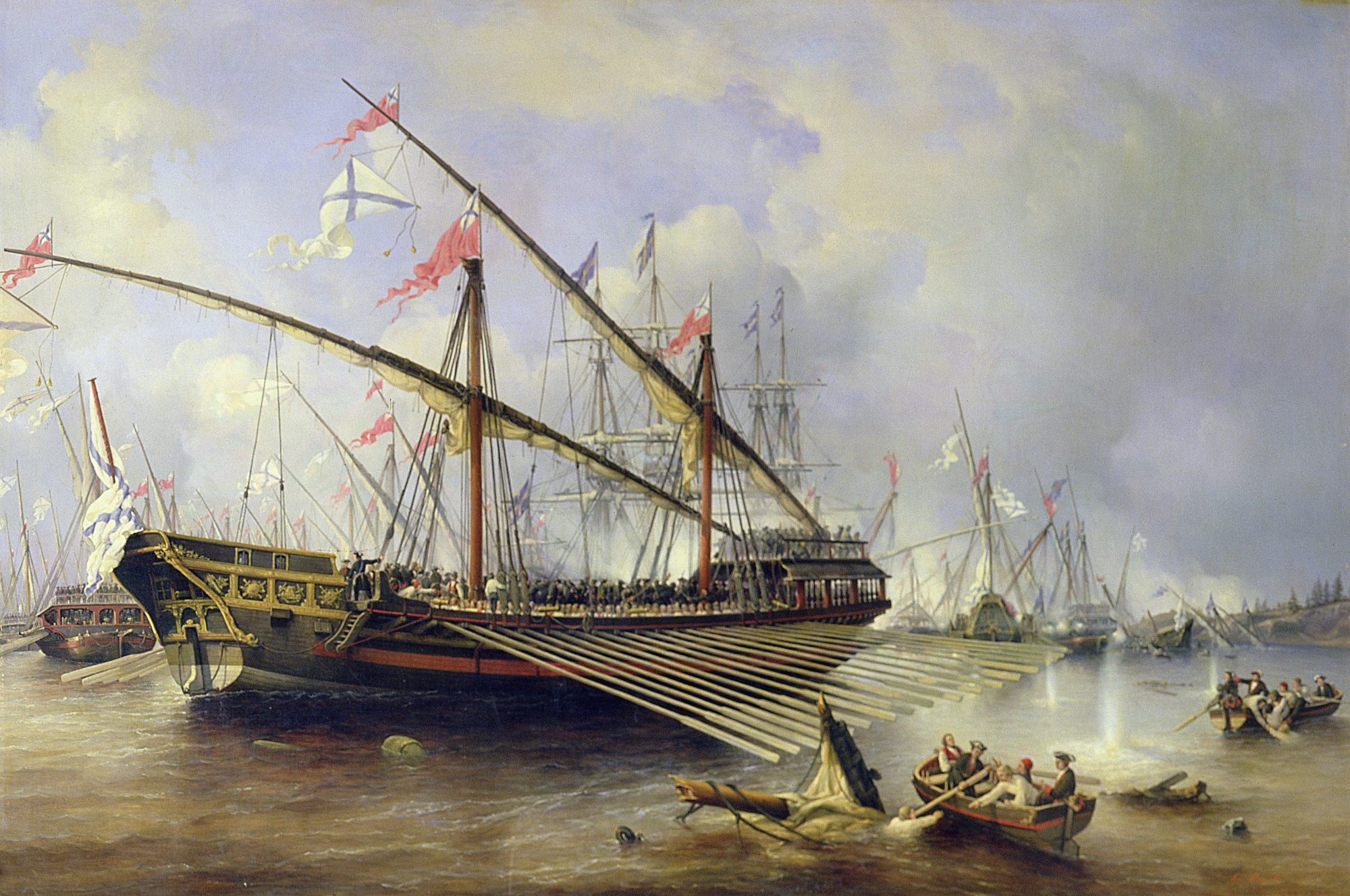
Russian galley, ca 1720, similar to those D'Eguilles served on as an officer in the Maltese Navy

In 1725, D'Eguilles joined the Navy of the Order of Saint John, maritime arm of the Knights of Malta. Originally formed to provide security against Barbary Coast pirates, by the 18th century its activities included raiding Muslim merchants in the Eastern Mediterranean. His elder brother was disinherited in 1734, but it was not until 1740 D’Éguilles gave up his naval career. Lacking the legal education required to follow his father, instead he tried a number of unsuccessful business ventures, including trading olive oil with the Americas and opening a theatre.

Various members of the de Boyer family had a background in the arts, including their great-uncle, the poet and dramatist Abbe Claude de Boyer (1618–1698). Their grandfather, Jean-Baptiste de Boyer (1640–1709), owned a famous art collection containing works by Titian, Caravaggio, Michelangelo, Van Dyck, Poussin, Rubens and Corregio. These connections led in 1736 to D’Éguilles being elected to the Académie de Marseille, a society for the Provencal intellectual and social elite, and he was appointed President in 1739.

After his first wife died in childbirth in 1741, D’Éguilles began production of a two volume guide to his grandfathers' art collection, with copies of the paintings done by the French engraver Pierre-Jean Mariette. With little connecting him to Provence, he moved to Paris, where he gained access to the literary salon headed by Louis de Bachaumont. The two became friends and Bachaumont recommended him to the French foreign minister, Jean-Jacques Amelot. The 1740–1748 War of the Austrian Succession was then in progress and D’Éguilles was employed carrying messages to French envoys in Berlin and Dresden.

Amelot was dismissed in May 1743 and replaced in November 1744 by René D'Argenson, who served in the army with his brother, the Marquis d'Argens. When Charles Edward Stuart launched the Jacobite rising of 1745, D'Argenson asked D’Éguilles to go to Scotland as an unofficial envoy; not being a professional diplomat made it easier to disown him if needed, but he was hampered by his inability to speak English. He left Dunkirk on 26 September on board the French privateer l'Ésperance, with two other ships carrying weapons and money, arriving in Edinburgh on 14 October. Despite his lack of official credentials, Charles introduced him as Ambassador, using him as proof of French support for the Rising.

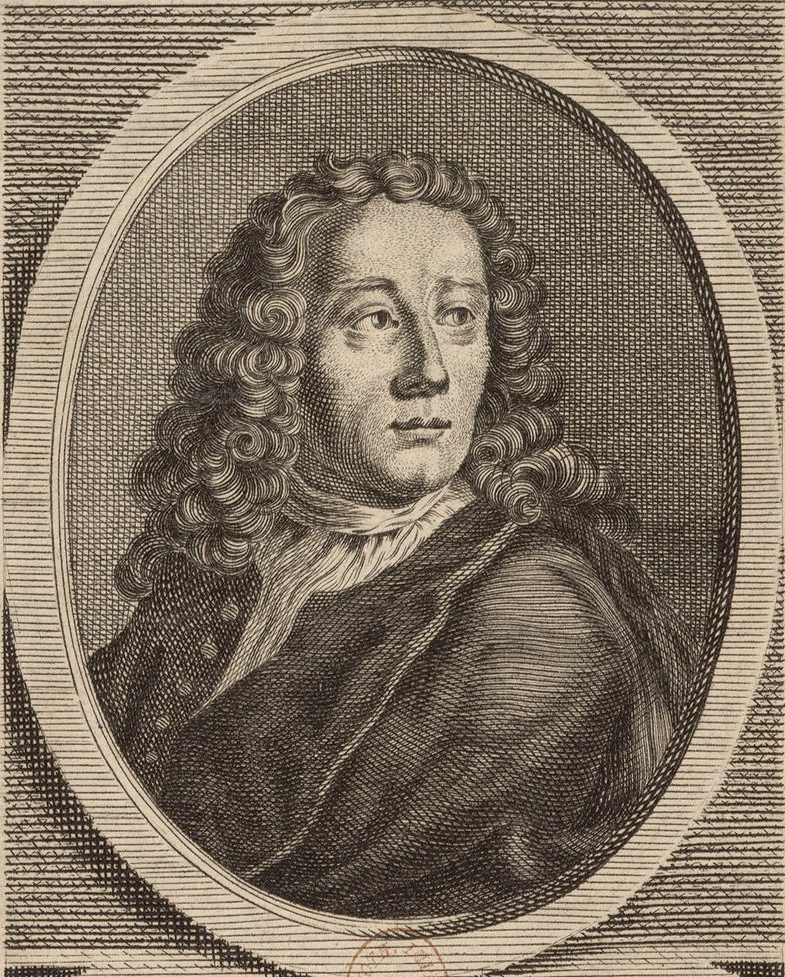
D'Eguilles' elder brother, philosopher and author Jean-Baptiste, Marquis d'Argens

In a letter to D'Argenson of 23 October, D'Eguilles concluded the Jacobite position was hopeless without a French invasion. He was present at the meetings held in Edinburgh on 30 and 31 October to discuss the invasion of England, which revealed deep divisions between Charles and his Scots supporters. Many Scots joined the rebellion hoping to dissolve the 1707 Union with England; this now seemed achievable, and although they were willing to assist an English rising or French invasion, they would not do it on their own. D'Eguilles assured Charles of his support for the invasion, but told the Scots in private it was a mistake. Lord Elcho later wrote "...the majority of the Council (wanted to) remain in Scotland to watch events and defend their own land. This was also the opinion in secret of the Marquis d‘Eguilles."

After the Battle of Culloden in April 1746, he was captured and held in Carlisle for six months while the British and French governments arranged terms of exchange. In June 1747, D’Éguilles wrote a report on the rising to Count Maurepas, the Naval Minister; this was generally critical of the Jacobite leadership, while his opinion of Charles himself was so low, one option he suggested was the establishment of a Scots Republic, rather than a Stuart restoration. After his application for another diplomatic post was unsuccessful, D’Éguilles returned to Provence where his father purchased him the office of Président à mortier in the Provencal Parliament, one of the most senior legal posts in pre-1789 France.

In 1748, he married Catherine Stanhope or Wannup, whom he met during his time in England; she died in 1761, which was followed two years later by an upheaval in his public career. Like many devout Catholics, the de Boyers were supporters of the Society of Jesus or Jesuits; D’Éguilles and his brothers had been educated by Jesuit tutors. Their wealth and influence brought them enemies; when the Jesuit mission in Martinique went bankrupt in 1760, the Society in Paris denied responsibility for their debts. This led to calls for their suppression and in 1762, legal proceedings were filed against them in the Provencal Parliament. D’Éguilles blocked them in his capacity of Président à mortier and in May 1763, he was forced to resign and letters he published backing the Jesuits were burned by the public hangman. He was banished from France 'in perpetuity,' joining his brother at the court of Frederick the Great; as Voltaire remarked, one brother was exiled for opposing the Jesuits, the other for supporting them.

After D’Éguilles returned home in 1767, he offered to reverse the 1734 legal order disinheriting his elder brother, an offer that was refused. His return from exile was conditional on remaining in Provence; he spent the rest of his life living quietly in retirement at the family chateau in Éguilles, where he died on 8 October 1783.

== Legacy ==
His son and heir, Pierre-Jean de Boyer, emigrated in 1791 during the French Revolution and his estates were confiscated, divided into 50 lots, then distributed to local farmers. His attempts to reclaim these lands after the 1814 restoration of Louis XVIII led to protracted legal disputes.

The Hôtel Boyer d'Éguilles was built in 1675 to a design by the Baroque artist Pierre Puget, who lived in Marseille and contains ceilings attributed to the painter and artist Sébastien Barras; it is now a protected monument.

== Sources ==
- D'Arnaud, André Bouyala (1955). "An 18th Century Provencal Gentleman; the Marquis d'Eguilles". Revue d'Histoire Moderne & Contemporaine. 2 (1).
- Gasper, Julia (2013). The Marquis d'Argens: A Philosophical Life. Lexington. ISBN 978-0739182338.
- Gibson, John S (1995). Edinburgh in the '45: Bonnie Prince Charlie at Holyroodhouse. Saltire Society. ISBN 978-0854110674.
- La Porte, M (1820). Journal des Audiences de la Cour de Cassation. J Smith, Paris.
- McLynn, Frank (October 1980). "An Eighteenth-Century Scots Republic? An Unlikely Project from Absolutist France". The Scottish Historical Review. 59 (168).
- Riding, Jacqueline (2016). Jacobites; A New History of the 45 Rebellion. Bloomsbury. ISBN 978-1408819128.
- Wemyss, Alice (1853). Sibbold, John (ed.). Elcho of the '45 (2003 ed.). Saltire Society.

French nobility
Preceded by Pierre-Jean de Boyer (father)	Marquis d'Éguilles; 1751–1783	Succeeded by Pierre-Jean de Boyer (son)

Preceded by Jules-François-Paul Fauris de Saint-Vincens	Président à mortier Provencal Regional Parliament; 1747–1763	Succeeded by Jean-Luc de Thomassin de Peynier
