= Maurice Pic =

French entomologist

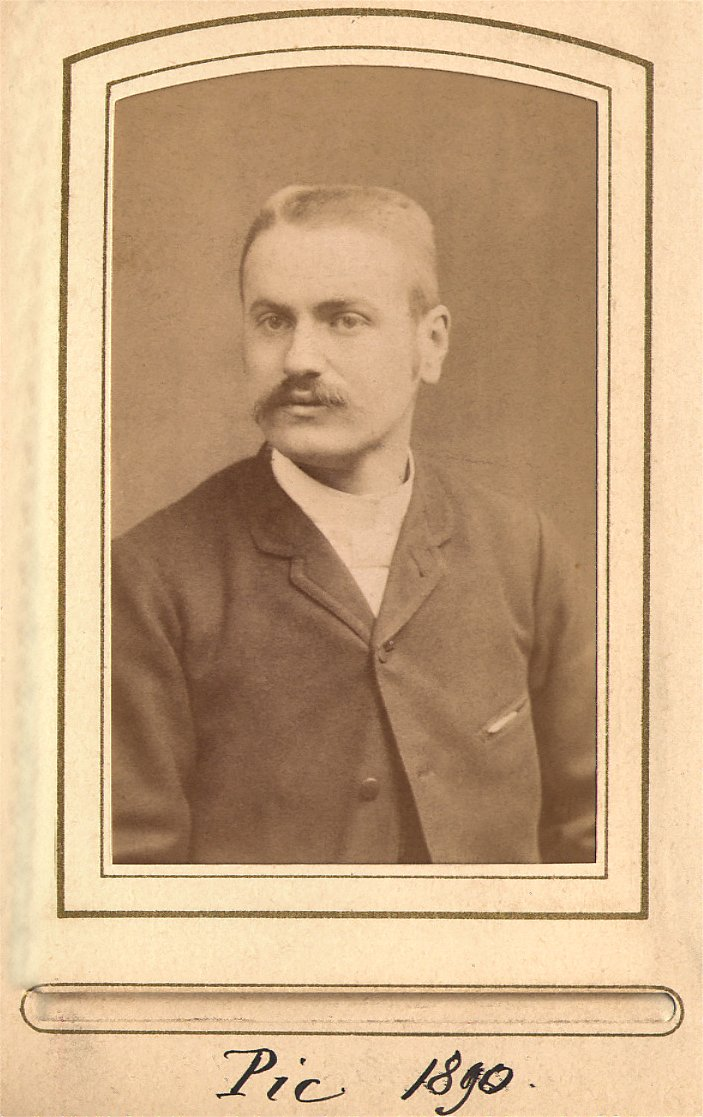
Maurice Pic

Maurice Pic (23 March 1866, in Marrigny near Digoin – 29 December 1957, in Les Guerreaux) was a French entomologist who specialised in Coleoptera. He contributed to Mary-Louis Fauconnet's Catalogue raisonné des coléoptères de Saône-et-Loire (Le Creusot, Martet, 1887) and wrote many short papers, many in L'Échange, Revue Linnéenne describing world beetles. His most important work was for Sigmund Schenkling's still very relevant Coleopterorum Catalogus.

Pic's collection is in the Muséum national d'histoire naturelle in Paris.

== Works ==
Excluding short papers.

- 1898–1934. Matériaux pour servir a l'étude des Longicornes. Cahiers 1–11, 120 pages
- 1902. Coleoptera Heteromera Fam. Hylophilidae. P. Wytsman (ed.), Genera Insectorum. Fascicule 8. P. Wytsman, Brussels, 14 pages, 1 pl.
- Parts 14. Hylophilidae (1911); 26. Scraptiidae, Pedilidae (1911); 36. Anthicidae (1911); 41. Ptinidae (1912); 48. Anobiidae (1912); 55. Bruchidae (1913); 58. Dascillidae, Helodidae, Eucinetidae (1914); 81. Rhipiceridae (1925); 87. Phloeophilidae, Rhadalidae, Prionoceridae (1926); 94. Phengodidae, Karumiidae (1927); 103. Dasytidae: Melyrinae (1929); 155. Dasytidae: Dasytinae (1937) of Schenkling S. (ed.), Coleopterorum Catalogus. W. Junk, Berlin.

== Periodicals ==
He published 3 periodicals:

- L'Échange, 1885–1956, 543 issues
- Mélanges Exotico-Entomologiques, 1911–1939, 71 issues
- Opuscula Martialis, 1940–1944, 13 issues
