= Château de Saint Aubin =

Château in Saône-et-Loire, Burgundy, France

Coordinates: 46.5746°N 3.7498°E

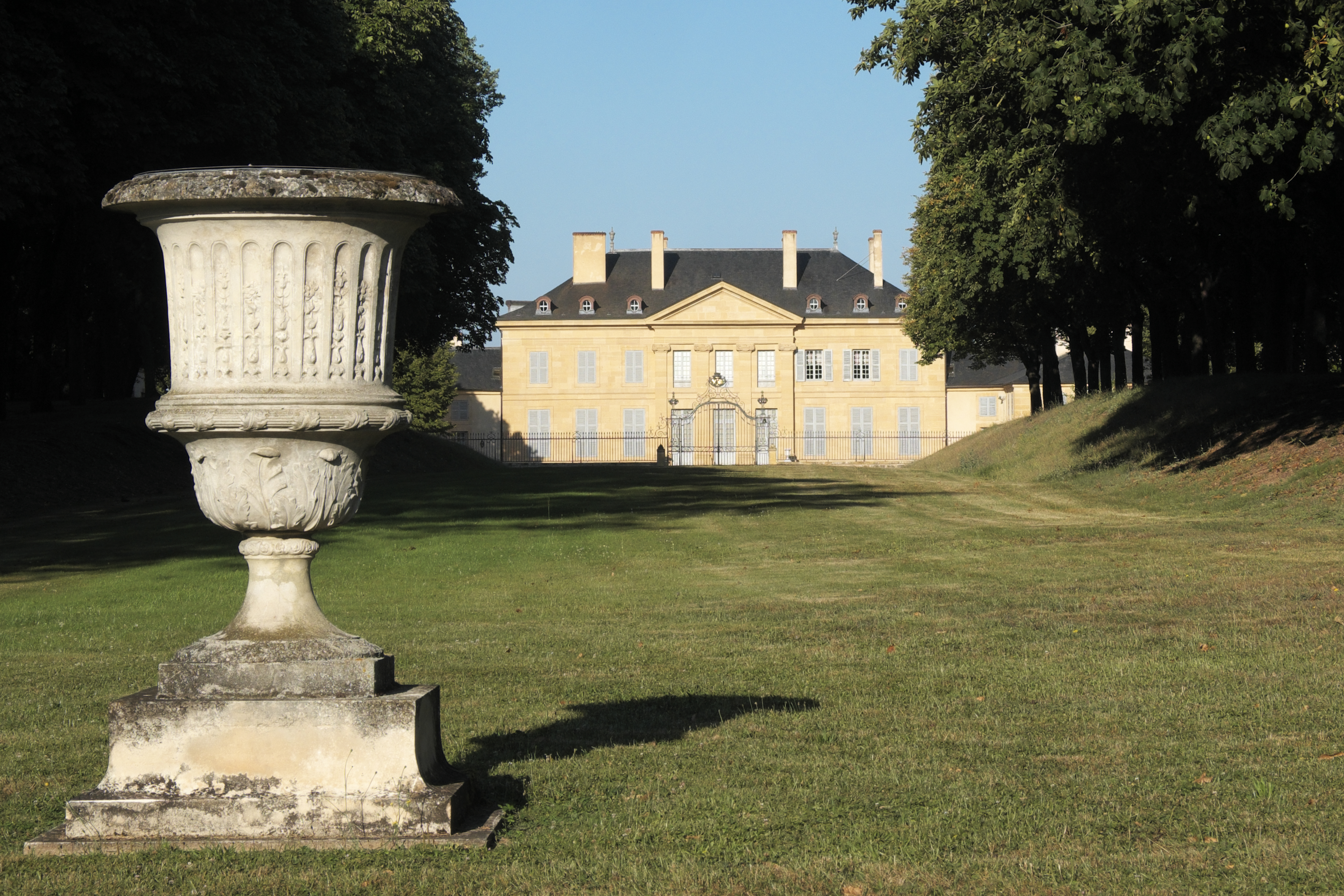
- Interactive map of the Château de Saint Aubin area

The Château de Saint Aubin is a historic château in Saint-Aubin-sur-Loire, Saône-et-Loire, Burgundy, France.

== History ==
The chateau was built from 1771 to 1777 for Charles Jean-Baptiste des Gallois de La Tour.

It is owned by Kristen Van Riel, a retired corporate lawyer.

== Architectural significance ==
The chateau was designed by architect Edme Verniquet in the Neoclassical architectural style. It has been listed as an official historical monument since February 4, 1943.
