= Charles Jean-Baptiste des Gallois de La Tour =

French public official (1715–1802)

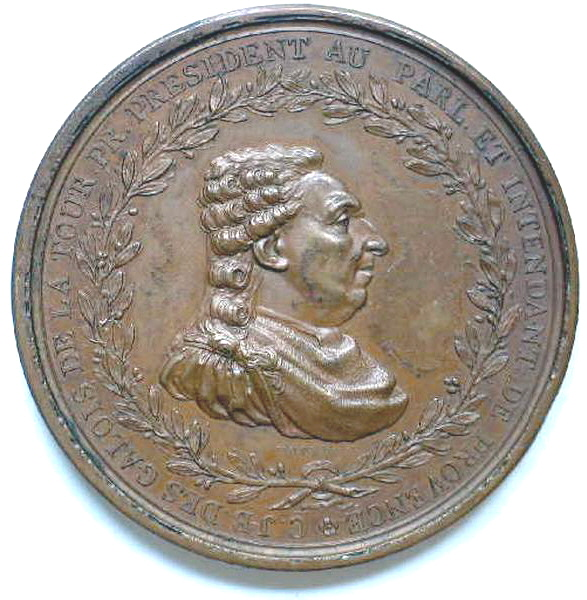
- Born: 1715; Paris, France
- Died: 1802 (aged 86–87)
- Occupation: Public official
- Spouse: Marie-Madeleine d'Aligre
- Parent: Jean-Baptiste des Gallois de La Tour
- Relatives: Étienne Claude d'Aligre (father-in-law)

Charles Jean-Baptiste des Gallois de La Tour (1715–1802) was a French public official. He served as the last First President of the Parlement of Aix-en-Provence from 1748 to 1771, and from 1775 to 1790.

== Biography ==
=== Early life ===
Charles Jean-Baptiste des Gallois de La Tour was born in 1715 in Paris. His father, Jean-Baptiste des Gallois de La Tour, served as First President of the Parlement of Aix-en-Provence from 1735 to 1747.

=== Career ===
He served as an Advisor to the Parlement of Aix-en-Provence in 1735. Later, he served as its last First President from 1748 to 1771, and from 1775 to 1790.

=== Personal life ===
He married Marie-Madeleine d'Aligre, daughter of Étienne Claude d'Aligre, who served as the Second President of the Parlement of Paris and one of the wealthiest aristocrats in France at the time.

In 1771, he purchased the Château de Saint Aubin in Saint-Aubin-sur-Loire from Charles Guillaume Le Normant d'Étiolles (1717-1799).

He died in 1802.
