= Lesme =

- Commune
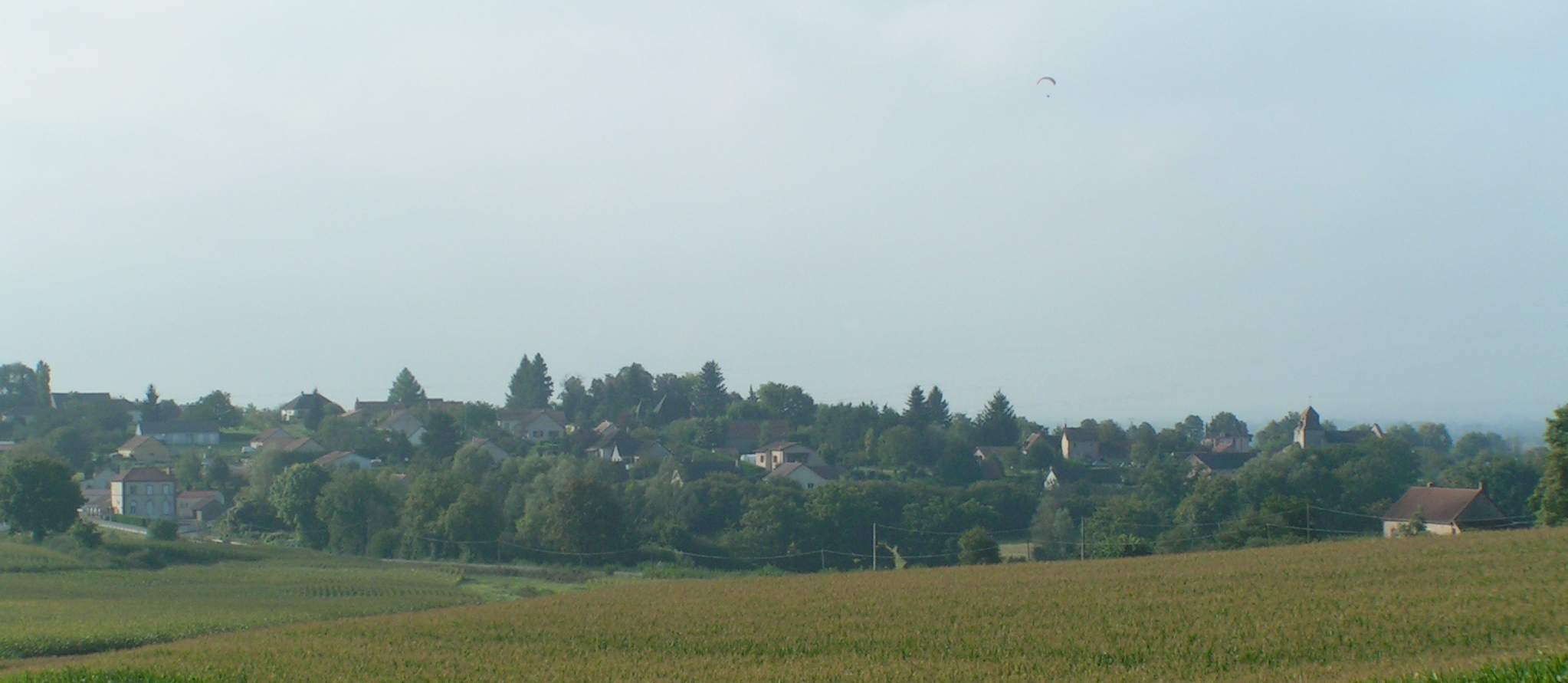
- A general view of Lesme
- Location of Lesme
- Location within France Location within Bourgogne-Franche-Comté
- Coordinates: 46°39′00″N 3°43′00″E
- Country: France
- Region: Bourgogne-Franche-Comté
- Department: Saône-et-Loire
- Arrondissement: Charolles
- Canton: Digoin

Government
  - Mayor (2020–2026): Thierry Bernardin
- Area^{1}: 5.08 km^{2} (1.96 sq mi)
- Elevation: 236 m (774 ft)
- Highest elevation: 260 m (850 ft)
- Lowest elevation: 202 m (663 ft)
- Population (2023): 173
  - Density: 34.1/km^{2} (88.2/sq mi)
- Time zone: UTC+01:00 (CET)
  - Summer (DST): UTC+02:00 (CEST)
- INSEE/Postal code: 71255 /71140
- ^{1} French Land Register data, which excludes lakes, ponds, glaciers > 1 km^{2} (0.386 sq mi or 247 acres) and river estuaries.

Lesme (French pronunciation: [lɛm]) is a commune in the Saône-et-Loire department in the region of Bourgogne-Franche-Comté in eastern France.

== See also ==
- Communes of the Saône-et-Loire department
