= Canton of Digoin =

Coordinates: 46.48°N 3.98°E

The canton of Digoin is an administrative division of the Saône-et-Loire department, eastern France. Its borders were modified at the French canton reorganisation which came into effect in March 2015. Its seat is in Digoin.

It consists of the following communes:

1. Bourbon-Lancy
2. Chalmoux
3. Cronat
4. Digoin
5. Gilly-sur-Loire
6. Les Guerreaux
7. Lesme
8. Maltat
9. Mont
10. La Motte-Saint-Jean
11. Perrigny-sur-Loire
12. Saint-Agnan
13. Saint-Aubin-sur-Loire
14. Varenne-Saint-Germain
15. Vitry-sur-Loire
