= Jean-Baptiste des Gallois de La Tour =

French public official

- Died: 1747
- Occupation: Public official
- Children: Charles Jean-Baptiste des Gallois de La Tour

Jean-Baptiste des Gallois de La Tour (unknown – 1747) was a French public official. He served as the First President of the Parlement of Aix-en-Provence (an institutio. In the province of Provence) from 1735 to 1747. He is remembered for his relative tolerance of witchcraft and Protestantism.

== Biography ==
=== Early life ===
Jean-Baptiste des Gallois de La Tour was born in an old French aristocratic family from Forez.

=== Career ===
He served as an Advisor in the Parlement of Paris, and later as an intendant in Brittany and Poitou.

He served as the last First President of the Parlement of Aix-en-Provence from 1748 to 1771, and from 1775 to 1790.

During the trial of the alleged witch Catherine Cadière and the Jesuit Fr Jean-Baptiste Girard (1680-1733), he was remarkably lenient.

Although he opposed the Protestant uprising in Cabrières-d'Aigues, it has been suggested that he did so humanely. Indeed, he appealed to Louis Phélypeaux, comte de Saint-Florentin (1707-1777) for clemency, adding that those were mostly peasants and they should not be fined too heavily, lest they became indigent.

=== Personal life ===
He had a son, Charles Jean-Baptiste des Gallois de La Tour (1715-1802), who served as the last First President of the Parlement of Aix-en-Provence.

He died in 1747.
