= Jean Maynier =

French public official

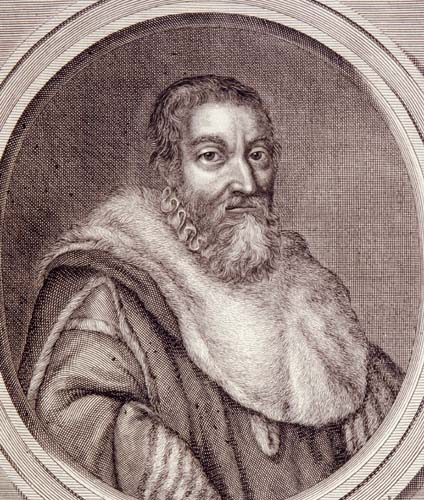
- Jean Maynier d'Oppède, by J. Cundier, 1724.
- Born: 1495
- Died: 1558
- Occupation: Public official
- Parent: Accurse Maynier

Jean Maynier, baron d'Oppède (1495 – 1558) was a French public official. He served as the First President of the Parlement of Aix-en-Provence in 1543.

== Biography ==
=== Early life ===
Jean Maynier was born in 1495. His father, Accurse Maynier (1450-1513), served as the First President of the Parlement of Aix-en-Provence in 1507.

=== Career ===
He was appointed First President of the Parlement of Aix-en-Provence in Aix-en-Provence in December 1543.

He is remembered for being responsible for the 1545 Massacre of Mérindol, engendered in part by his highly coloured accounts forwarded to Francis I of activities in the Vaudois of Protestants, and encouraged by the papacy to root out the "heretics" in the Venaissin, culminated in the massacre in which hundreds or thousands of Waldensians were killed at the order of the king. His responsibility is shared by Antoine Escalin des Aimars, who while in Marseille as he was returning from the Italian Wars with 2,000 veterans, the Bandes de Piémont, was requested to assist Jean Maynier d'Oppède in the repression. The massacres were followed by a wave of looting.

=== Death ===
He died in 1558.
