= Province of Provence =

The Province of Provence as a province of France from 1486 to 1790.

== History ==
Soon after Provence became part of France, it became involved in the Wars of Religion that swept the country in the 16th century. Between 1493 and 1501, many Jews were expelled from their homes and sought sanctuary in the region of Avignon, which was still under the direct rule of the Pope. In 1545, the Parlement of Aix-en-Provence ordered the destruction of the villages of Lourmarin, Mérindol, Cabriéres in the Luberon, because their inhabitants were Vaudois, of Italian Piedmontese origin, and were not considered sufficiently orthodox Catholics. Most of Provence remained strongly Catholic, though Protestants controlled the Principality of Orange, an enclave ruled by William of the House of Orange-Nassau of the Netherlands, who inherited it in 1544 and which was not incorporated into France until 1673. An army of the Catholic League laid siege to the Protestant city of Mėnerbes in the Vaucluse between 1573 and 1578. The wars did not stop until the end of the 16th century, with the consolidation of power in Provence by the Bourbon kings.

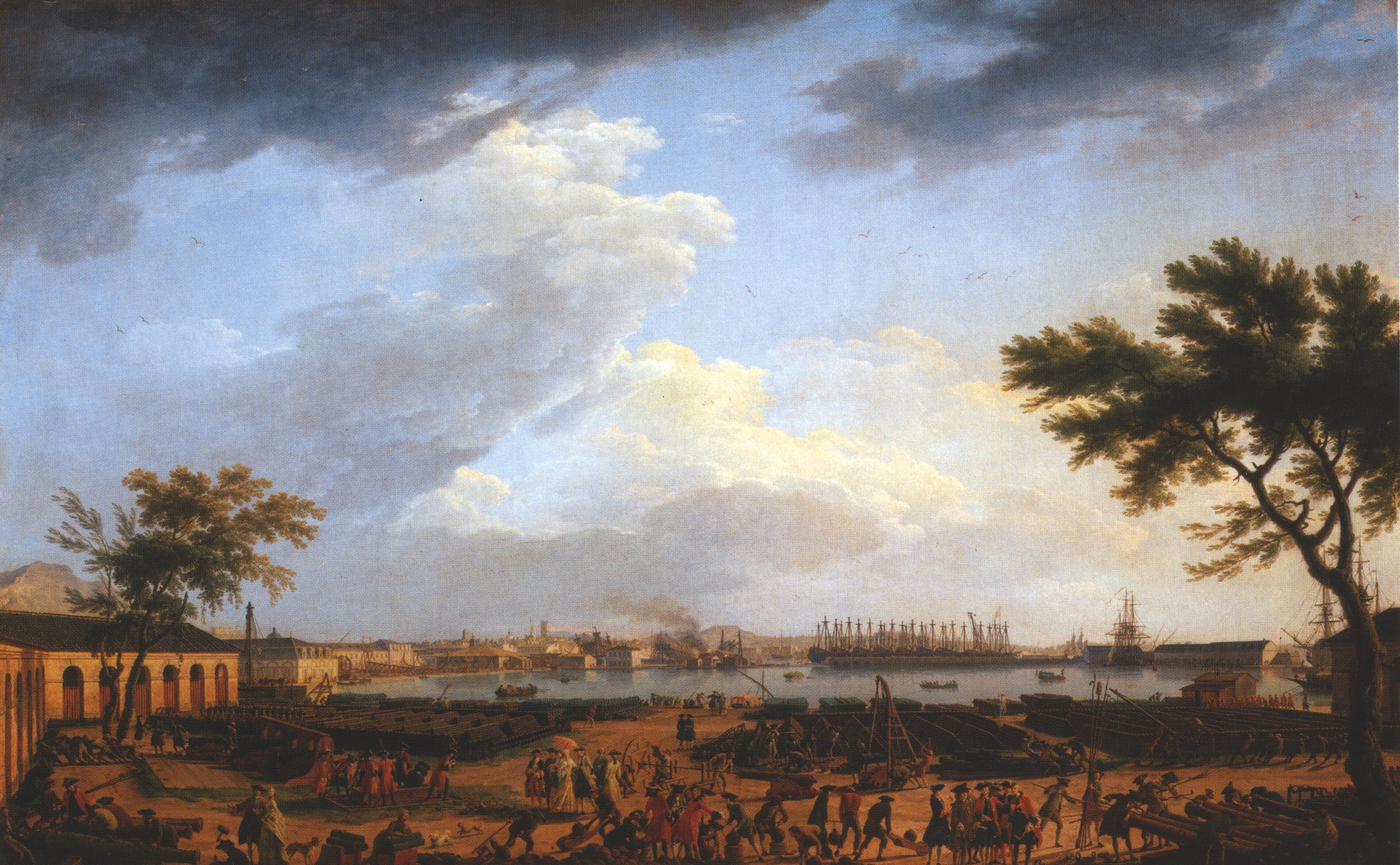
View of Toulon Harbour around 1750, by Joseph Vernet

The semi-independent Parliament of Provence in Aix and some of the cities of Provence, particularly Marseille, continued to rebel against the authority of the Bourbon king. After uprisings in 1630–31 and 1648–1652, the young King Louis XIV had two large forts, fort St. Jean and Fort St. Nicholas, built at the harbour entrance to control the city's unruly population.

At the beginning of the 17th century, Cardinal Richelieu began to build a naval arsenal and dockyard at Toulon to serve as a base for a new French Mediterranean fleet. The base was greatly enlarged by Jean-Baptiste Colbert, the minister of Louis XIV, who also commissioned his chief military engineer Vauban to strengthen the fortifications around the city.

At the beginning of the 17th century, Provence had a population of about 450,000 people. It was predominantly rural, devoted to raising wheat, wine, and olives, with small industries for tanning, pottery, perfume-making, and ship and boat building. Provençal quilts, made from the mid-17th century onwards, were successfully exported to England, Spain, Italy, Germany and the Netherlands. There was considerable commerce along the coast, and up and down the Rhône river. The cities: Marseille, Toulon, Avignon and Aix-en-Provence, saw the construction of boulevards and richly decorated private houses.

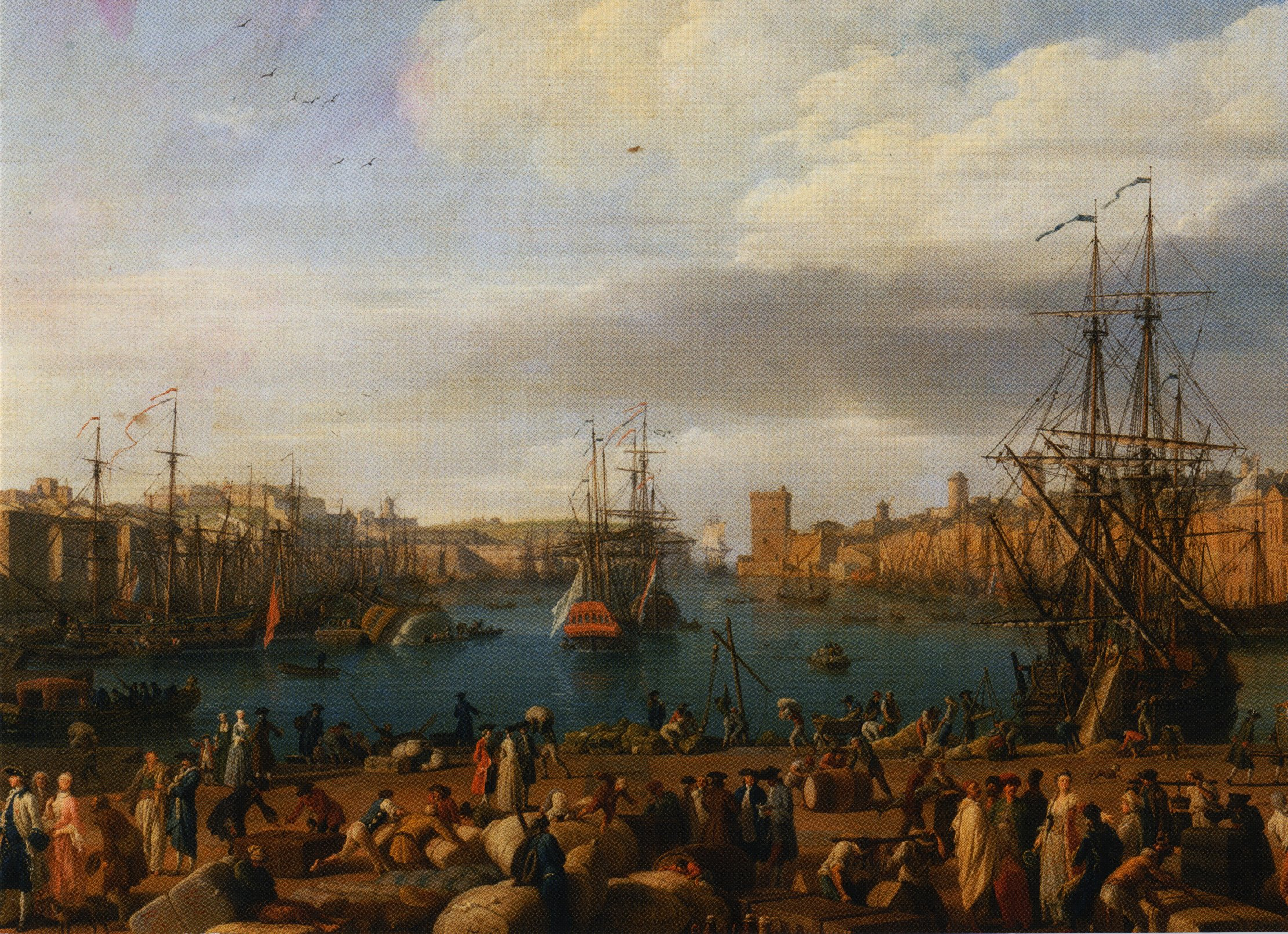
Marseille in 1754, by Vernet

At the beginning of the 18th century, Provence suffered from the economic malaise of the end of the reign of Louis XIV. The Great Plague of Marseille struck the region between 1720 and 1722, beginning in Marseille, killing some 40,000 people. Still, by the end of the century, many artisanal industries began to flourish; making perfumes in Grasse; olive oil in Aix and the Alpilles; textiles in Orange, Avignon and Tarascon; and faience pottery in Marseille, Apt, Aubagne, and Moustiers-Sainte-Marie. Many immigrants arrived from Liguria and the Piedmont in Italy. By the end of the 18th century, Marseille had a population of 120,000 people, making it the third largest city in France.
