= Maltat =

- Commune
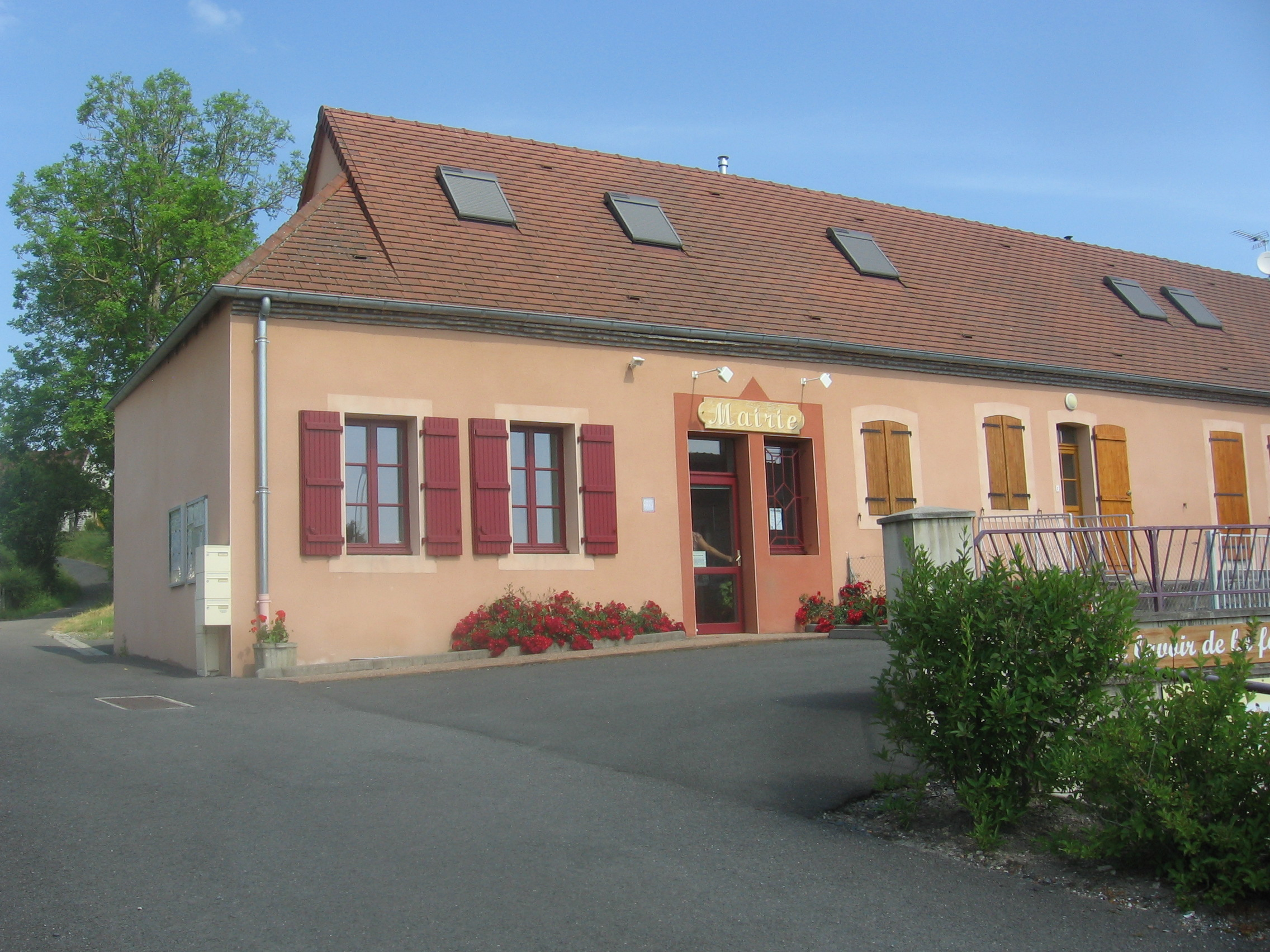
- The town hall in Maltat
- Location of Maltat
- Location within France Location within Bourgogne-Franche-Comté
- Coordinates: 46°41′00″N 3°49′00″E
- Country: France
- Region: Bourgogne-Franche-Comté
- Department: Saône-et-Loire
- Arrondissement: Charolles
- Canton: Digoin

Government
  - Mayor (2020–2026): Christine Racine
- Area^{1}: 31.35 km^{2} (12.10 sq mi)
- Elevation: 232 m (761 ft)
- Highest elevation: 438 m (1,437 ft)
- Lowest elevation: 220 m (720 ft)
- Population (2023): 278
  - Density: 8.87/km^{2} (23.0/sq mi)
- Time zone: UTC+01:00 (CET)
  - Summer (DST): UTC+02:00 (CEST)
- INSEE/Postal code: 71273 /71140
- ^{1} French Land Register data, which excludes lakes, ponds, glaciers > 1 km^{2} (0.386 sq mi or 247 acres) and river estuaries.

Maltat (French pronunciation: [malta]) is a commune in the Saône-et-Loire department in the region of Bourgogne-Franche-Comté in eastern France.

== See also ==
- Communes of the Saône-et-Loire department
