= Varenne-Saint-Germain =

- Commune
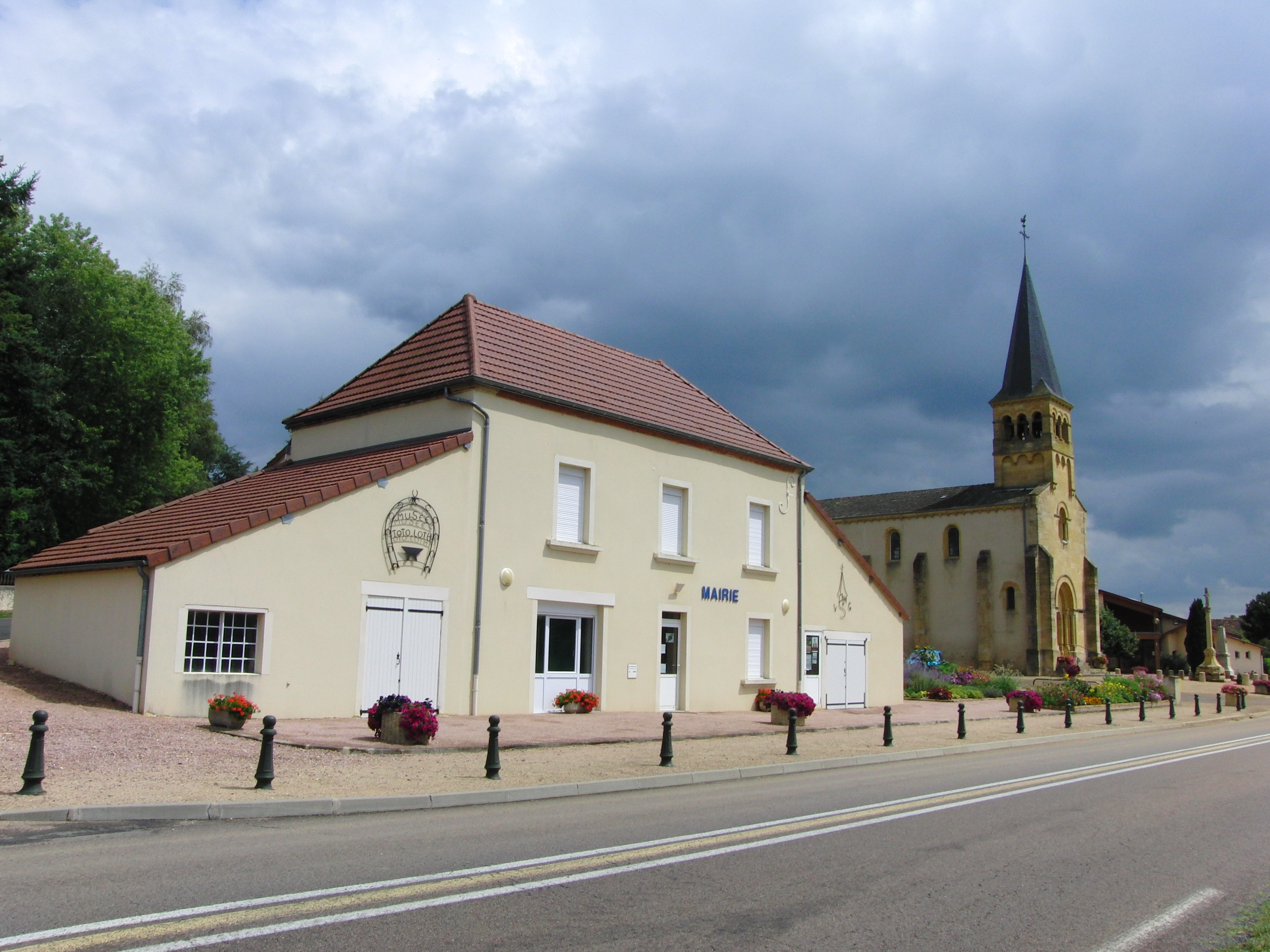
- The town hall in Varenne-Saint-Germain
- Location of Varenne-Saint-Germain
- Location within France Location within Bourgogne-Franche-Comté
- Coordinates: 46°25′47″N 4°01′34″E
- Country: France
- Region: Bourgogne-Franche-Comté
- Department: Saône-et-Loire
- Arrondissement: Charolles
- Canton: Digoin
- Area^{1}: 15.62 km^{2} (6.03 sq mi)
- Elevation: 240 m (790 ft)
- Highest elevation: 278 m (912 ft)
- Lowest elevation: 227 m (745 ft)
- Population (2023): 684
  - Density: 43.8/km^{2} (113/sq mi)
- Time zone: UTC+01:00 (CET)
  - Summer (DST): UTC+02:00 (CEST)
- INSEE/Postal code: 71557 /71600
- ^{1} French Land Register data, which excludes lakes, ponds, glaciers > 1 km^{2} (0.386 sq mi or 247 acres) and river estuaries.

Varenne-Saint-Germain (French pronunciation: [vaʁɛn sɛ̃ ʒɛʁmɛ̃]) is a commune in the Saône-et-Loire department in the region of Bourgogne-Franche-Comté in eastern France.

== Geography ==
Varenne-Saint-Germain is bordered by the Digoin commune to the north, Vitry-en-Charollais to the east, Saint-Yan to the south and Chassenard to the west. The Arconce flows north-northwest through the middle of the commune, then flows into the Loire, which forms parts of the commune's western border.

== History ==
In 1793, during the French Revolution, Reuillon, hamlet of Varennes-Reuillon, was renamed to La Montagne. During the Second World War, the commune was crossed by the demarcation line; the remains of a border post are still present on the road D982. The commune of Varenne-Saint-Germain was created in 1973 by merging the communes of Saint-Germain-des-Rives and Varenne-Reuillon.

== Demographics ==
In 2018, the commune had 718 inhabitants, an increase of 5.43% compared to 2013.

== Sights ==
- Château de Pontamailly, former property of Nicolas du Bessey de Contenson (who had bought the barony of Pontamailly in 1771). The remains of the castle were largely rebuilt in 1875.
- La Motte-Reuillon castle mound, whose central platform measures about 30 meters in diameter and where the remains of a tower remain.

== See also ==
- Communes of the Saône-et-Loire department
