= Parlement of Aix-en-Provence =

Provincial French parlement during the Ancien Régime

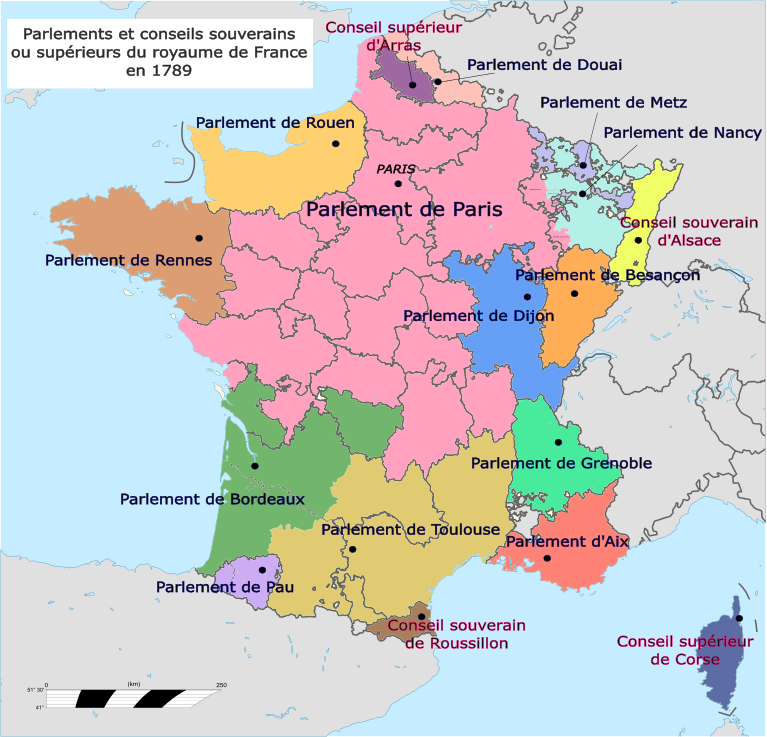
Territories assigned to the Parlements and Sovereign Councils of the Kingdom of France in 1789

The Parlement of Aix-en-Provence was the provincial parlement of Provence from 1501 to 1790. It was headquartered in Aix-en-Provence, which served as the de facto capital of Provence.

== History ==
Provence was incorporated into the Kingdom of France in 1481 after the last Count of Provence left the region to Louis XI. Two decades later, in 1501, King Louis XII of France (1462–1515) established the Parlement of Provence in Aix-en-Provence. By 1535, the powers of the seneschal of Provence were given to the Parlement of Aix. It was modeled after the Parlement of Paris. It set administrative and regulatory guidelines for Provence. It was also in charge of police and healthcare, as well as the oversight of boarding houses, prostitution, religious freedom, etc. At times, the Parlement was closer to the King of France or the Pope, depending on its wishes. For example, in 1590, when it refused to follow Henry IV of France (1553–1610), the King established another parlement in Pertuis.

It comprised first presidents, présidents à mortier, advisors, general advocates, advocates for the poor, etc. By 1604, it became legal to purchase a hereditary position and pass it on to one's male heirs. By 1789, only 6% were commoners, the rest of which were aristocrats. A third were only recently ennobled, even though by 1769 it became practically impossible to join the Parlement if one failed to have four aristocratic ancestors.

It was dismantled in September 1790, during the French Revolution.

== First Presidents ==
- 1501-1502: Michel Riccio (1445–1515)
- 1502-1507: Antoine Mulet
- 1507-1509: Accurse Maynier
- 1509-1530: Gervais de Beaumont
- 1530-1531: Thomas Cuisinier
- 1531-1541: Barthélemy de Chasseneuz
- 1541-1544: Guillaume Garçonnet
- 1544-1557: Jean Maynier
- 1557-1564: Jean-Augustin de Foresta (1520–1588)
- 1564-1590: Bernard Prévot
- 1590-1599: Artus de Prunières
- 1599-1616: Guillaume du Vair
- 1616-1621: Marc-Antoine d'Escalis
- 1621-1632: Vincent-Anne de Forbin-Maynier
- 1632-1636: Hélie Lainé
- 1636: Guillaume de Fieubet
- 1636-1642: Joseph de Bernet
- 1644-1655: Jean de Mesgrigni
- 1665-1671: Henri de Forbin-Maynier
- 1674-1690: Arnoul Marin
- 1690-1710: Pierre-Cardin Lebret
- 1710-1735: Cardin Lebret (1675–1734)
- 1735-1747: Jean-Baptiste des Gallois de La Tour
- 1748-1771: Charles Jean-Baptiste des Gallois de La Tour
- 1775-1790: Charles Jean-Baptiste des Gallois de La Tour

== Président à mortier ==
- 1542: Jean Maynier d'Oppède
- 1543: François de La Fonds (also Lafont)
- 1553: Rémy Ambroix
- 1554: Jean-Augustin de Foresta
- 1554: Louis Puget de Fuveau
- 1558: François de Pérussis de Lauris
- 1559: Gaspard Garde de Vins
- 1568: Louis de Coriolis
- 1573: Boniface de Pellicot
- 1575: Claude de Pérussis
- 1575: Robert de Montcalm
- 1585: François d'Estienne de Saint-Jean
- 1585: Louis Chaine (also Chène)
- 1587: Raimond de Piolenc
- 1595: Marc-Antoine Escalis
- 1600: Laurent de Coriolis de Corbières
- 1604: Joseph Aimar de Montlaur
- 1610: Honoré Aimar de Montsallier (also Aymar)
- 1613: Jean-Baptiste Chaine
- 1615: Vincent-Anne de Forbin-Mainier d'Oppède
- 1616: Jean-Louis Monier de Châteaudeuil
- 1621: Gabriel Estienne de Saint-Jean
- 1622: Antoine Séguiran de Bouc
- 1624: Jean-Baptiste Forbin de la Roque-d'Anthéron
- 1630: Jean-Augustin Foresta de la Roquette
- 1632: Louis de Paule
- 1643: Charles de Grimaldi-Régusse (1612–1687)
- 1625: Honoré de Coriolis
- 1644: Lazare du Chaine de la Roquette
- 1645L Henri de Forbin-Maynier d'Oppède
- 1645: Melchior de Forbin de la Roque
- 1650: Louis de Cormis de Bregançon
- 1651: Pierre de Coriolis de Villeneuve d'Espinouse
- 1655: Henri d'Escalis de Sabran de Bras
- 1662: Auguste Thomas de la Garde
- 1662: Jean de Simiane de la Cepède de la Coste
- 1673: Jean-Baptiste de Forbin-Maynier d'Oppède
- 1674: Gaspard Grimaldy de Régusse
- 1674: Claude Milan de Cornillon
- 1686: Joseph-Anne de Valbelle de Tourves
- 1690: Jean-Baptiste-Joseph de Coriolis de Villeneuve d'Espinouse
- 1694: Silvy Raousset de Boulbon
- 1694: Antoine Albert du Chaine de Saint-Martin-d'Alignosc
- 1694: Pierre-Joseph de Laurens de Saint-Martin de Pallières
- 1699: François Boyer de Bandol
- 1702: Jean-Baptiste Thomassin de Saint-Paul
- 1702: Jean-Baptiste de Maliverny
- 1702: Honoré-Henri de Piolenc
- 1705: Jean-Estienne de Thomassin de Saint-Paul
- 1709: Pierre-Joseph de Laurent de Saint-Martin de Pallières
- 1712: Pierre de Coriolis d'Espinouse
- 1718: Cosme-Maximilien-Marcelin-Louis-Joseph de Valbelle de Sainte-Tulle
- 1718: Zacharie de Raousset de Boulbon
- 1720: Charles de Grimaldi-Régusse
- 1724: Charles-Louis-Sextius de Grimaldi-Régusse
- 1731: Joseph-Claude de Maliverny
- 1731: Jean-Louis-Gabriel de Thomassin de Saint-Paul
- 1733: Jean-Baptiste Bruny d'Entrecasteaux
- 1736: François-Charles-Xavier de Coriolis de Villeneuve d'Espinouse
- 1740: André-Elzéard d'Arbaud de Jouques (1676–1744)
- 1740: Gaspard de Gueidan (1688–1767)
- 1742: Louis de Thomassin de Peynier
- 1746: Jules-François-Paul Fauris de Saint-Vincens
- 1747: Alexandre-Jean-Baptiste de Boyer d'Eguilles
- 1748: Jean-Luc de Thomassin de Peynier
- 1756: Joseph-Étienne de Thomassin de Saint-Paul
- 1756: Bruno-Paul-Théodore Bruny d'Entrecasteaux (also Pierre-Paul-Théodore)
- 1766: Pierre de Laurens de Peyrolles
- 1767: Michel-Antoine d'Albert de Saint-Hippolyte
- 1768: André-Elzéard d'Arbaud de Jouques II (1737–1793)
- 1776: Jean-Louis-Martin Arlatan de Montaud
- 1776: François-Marie-Jean-Baptiste de Cabre
- 1777: Jean-Baptiste Jérome Bruny de la Tour-d'Aigues
- 1782: Alexandre de Fauris de Saint-Vincens (1750–1815)
- 1782: Jean-Baptiste-Joseph-Guillaume-Bruno Bruny d'Entrecasteaux
- 1782: Michel-Gabriel-Albert d'Albert de Saint-Hippolyte

== Counsellors ==
- Jean-François-Marie d'Arquier (1782)
