= La Motte-Saint-Jean =

- Commune
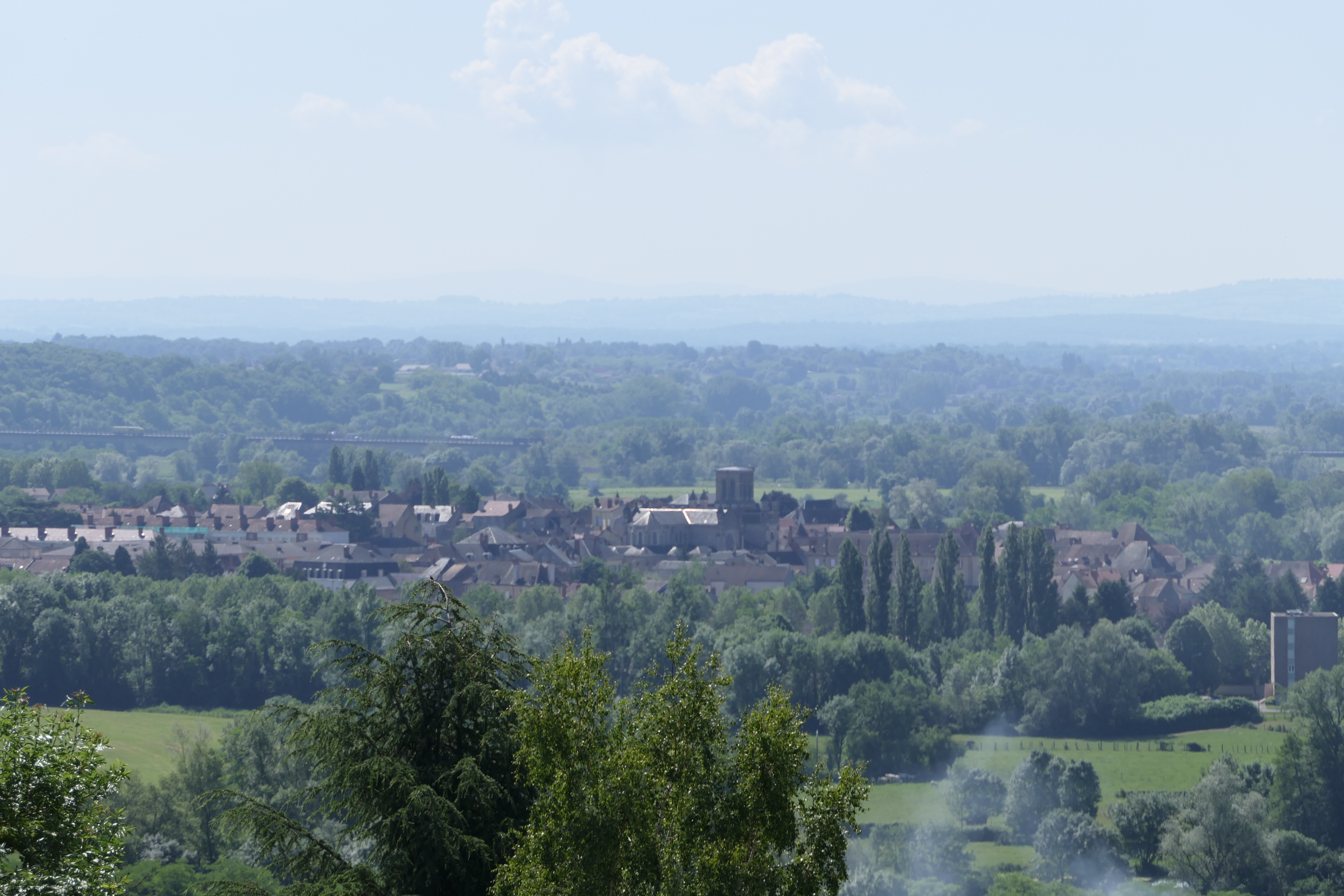
- A general view of La Motte-Saint-Jean
- Location of La Motte-Saint-Jean
- Location within France Location within Bourgogne-Franche-Comté
- Coordinates: 46°29′45″N 3°57′53″E
- Country: France
- Region: Bourgogne-Franche-Comté
- Department: Saône-et-Loire
- Arrondissement: Charolles
- Canton: Digoin
- Area^{1}: 21.32 km^{2} (8.23 sq mi)
- Elevation: 244 m (801 ft)
- Highest elevation: 340 m (1,120 ft)
- Lowest elevation: 222 m (728 ft)
- Population (2023): 1,170
  - Density: 54.9/km^{2} (142/sq mi)
- Time zone: UTC+01:00 (CET)
  - Summer (DST): UTC+02:00 (CEST)
- INSEE/Postal code: 71325 /71160
- ^{1} French Land Register data, which excludes lakes, ponds, glaciers > 1 km^{2} (0.386 sq mi or 247 acres) and river estuaries.

La Motte-Saint-Jean (French pronunciation: [la mɔt sɛ̃ ʒɑ̃]) is a commune in the Saône-et-Loire department in the region of Bourgogne-Franche-Comté in eastern France.

== See also ==
- Communes of the Saône-et-Loire department
