= Jean-François-Marie Arquier =

French jurist (1761-1794)

- Born: 17 June 1761; La Ciotat
- Died: 15 February 1794 (aged 32); Marseille
- Known for: Counsellor to the parliament of Provence
- Movement: Federalism (French Revolution)

Jean-François-Marie d'Arquier de Barbegal (1761–1794), also known as de Baumelles, parliamentarian from Aix in the 18th century, was involved in the federalist movement of 1793 during the French Revolution.

== Biography ==
Jean-François-Marie Arquier was born in La Ciotat on 17 June 1761 (Note: AD (13) La Ciotat, Birth act, 1761, 30/57). He is the son of François, Sieur de Barbegal, Lord of Baumelles, and Françoise Richard. He became advisor to the Parliament in Aix on 28 June 1782. Later he was initiated into a Masonic lodge in Aix, but remained there only two years, until 1786. (Note: Lodge of Friendship, founded in 1772 by Messrs. D'Allard, D'Alphéran and D'Eymar. BnF, "Archives et manuscrits", Bossu (8), read online, "Arquier, seign. de Beaumelle, Jean-Marie d’") On the eve of the French Revolution, he attended meetings of the nobility for the bailliage of Aix in 1789.

Arquier embraced the federalist cause before the Reign of Terror, then was sentenced to death by the Military Commission in Marseille on 26 Pluviose Year II (14 February 1794).

He was guillotined the following day, 27 Pluviose Year II (15 February 1794), in Marseille.

== Bibliography ==
- Prudhomme, Louis-Marie (1797). Histoire générale et impartiale des erreurs, des fautes et des crimes commis pendant la révolution française [General History and impartial errors, mistakes and crimes committed during the French Revolution] (in French). Paris: Rue des Marais, N° 20, Faubourg-Germain. p. 19. "Arquier (Jean-François-Marie)"
- Beauchamp, Alphonse (de); Coiffier de Verfeu, Henri-Louis (1806). Besson, P. J. (ed.). Biographie moderne: ou dictionnaire de tous les hommes morts ou vivans qui ont marqué à la fin du 18e siècle et au commencement de celui-ci, et sur-tout dans le cours de la révolution française, par leurs vertus, leurs talens, leus malheurs ou leurs crimes, etc [Modern Biography: or Dictionary of all the men dead or alive that marked the end of the 18th century, and the beginning of this one, especially during the French Revolution, by their virtues, their talents, their misfortunes or their crimes, etc.] (in French). Leipzig. p. 84. "Arquier (J.-Fr.-Mar)"

== See also ==
- Federalist revolts
