= Michel Riccio =

Italian-born French lawyer, public official and historian

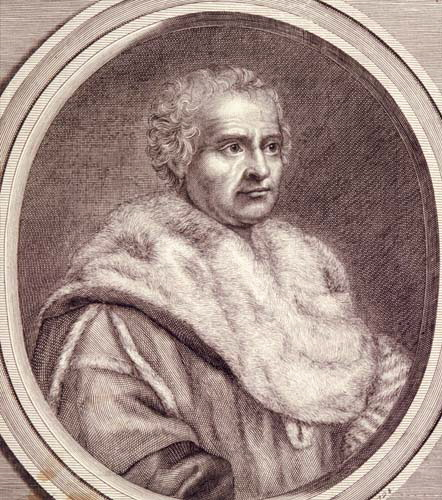
- Portrait of Michel Riccio by Jacques Cundier
- Born: 1445
- Died: 1515 (aged 69–70)
- Occupation: Public official

Michel Riccio (1445–1515) was an Italian-born French lawyer, public official and historian. He was known in Italian also as Michele Riccio / Rizzo or Ricci, in Latin Michael Ritius, and in the French form Michel de Ris or de Rys.

== Biography ==
=== Early life ===
Michel Riccio was born in 1445 in Naples, Italy.

=== Career ===
He started his career as a lawyer under Ferdinand I of Naples (1423–1494). He moved to France under the reign of King Charles VIII of France (1470–1498), for whom he served as an Advisor. In 1495, he served in the Parliament of Dijon, also known as the Parliament of Bourgogne. In 1498, King Louis XII of France (1462–1515) appointed him Senator of Milan.

From 1501 to 1502, he served as the first President of the Parlement of Aix-en-Provence. However, he was soon replaced by Antoine Mulet.

In 1505, Pope Julius II (1443–1513) sent him on a mission in Rome. The following year, in 1506, King Louis XII sent him to Genoa to put an end to a local revolt, to no avail.

As a historian, he wrote volumes about the Italian Wars and the dynastic rulers of the Kingdom of Naples.

=== Death ===
He died in 1515. The ashes of the historian are kept in the funeral chapel of the family Riccio / Rizzo / Ritius in the basilica of San Domenico Maggiore in Naples. Naples. A commemorative epigraph is still visible on the funeral monument.

== Bibliography ==
- Historia profectionis Caroli VIII (1496)
- Traité du devoir des gens de guerre et de leurs privilèges (1505)
- Defensoria oratio pro Ludovico XII (1506)
- De regibus Francorum libri III
- De regibus Hispaniæ libri III
- De regibus Hierosolymorum liber I
- De regibus Neapolis et Siciliæ libri IV
- De regibus Ungariæ libri II
