= Gilly-sur-Loire =

- Commune
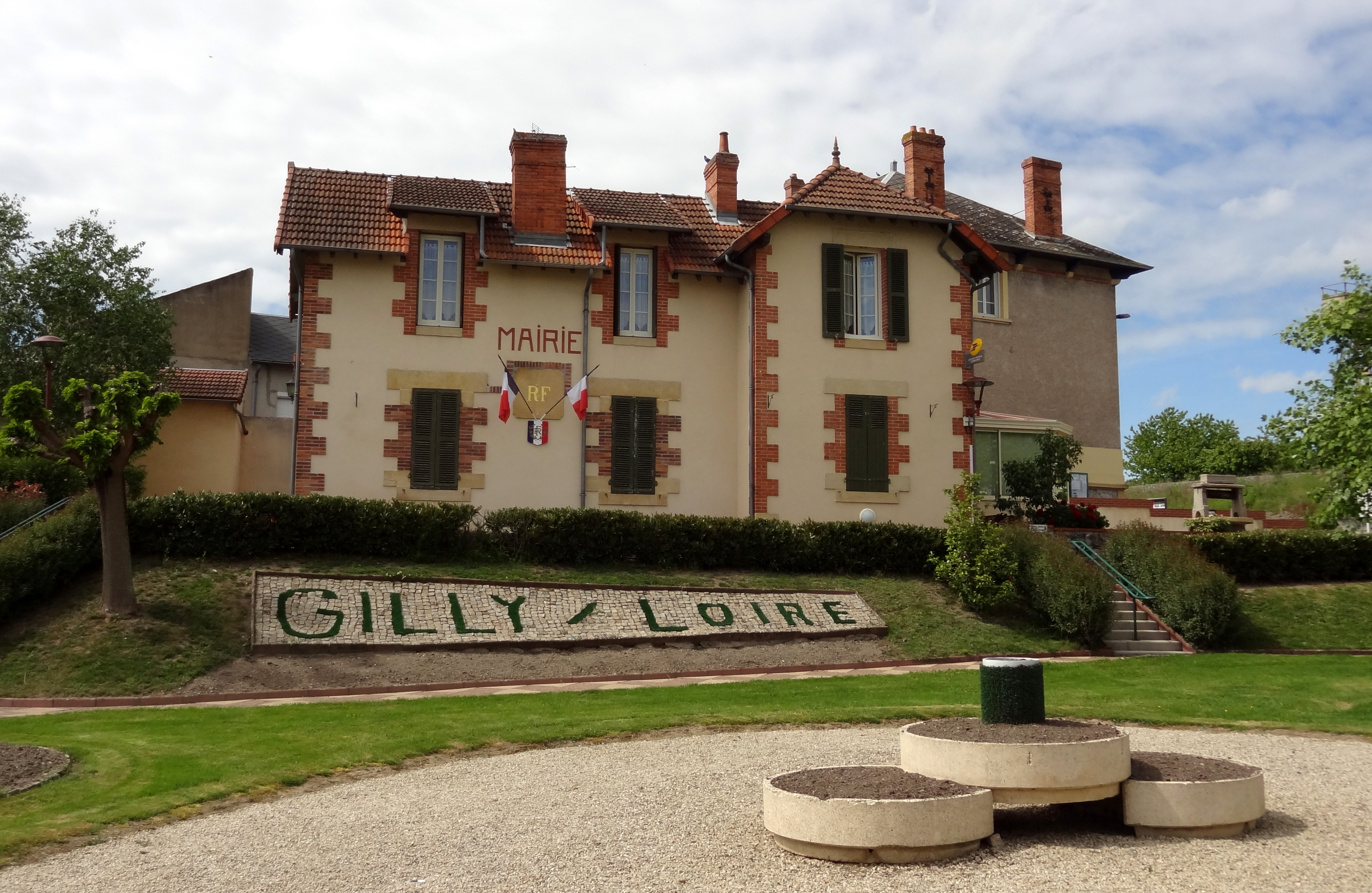
- The town hall in Gilly-sur-Loire
- Location of Gilly-sur-Loire
- Location within France Location within Bourgogne-Franche-Comté
- Coordinates: 46°32′00″N 3°47′00″E
- Country: France
- Region: Bourgogne-Franche-Comté
- Department: Saône-et-Loire
- Arrondissement: Charolles
- Canton: Digoin

Government
  - Mayor (2020–2026): Cédric Daguin
- Area^{1}: 22.63 km^{2} (8.74 sq mi)
- Elevation: 231 m (758 ft)
- Highest elevation: 311 m (1,020 ft)
- Lowest elevation: 207 m (679 ft)
- Population (2023): 480
  - Density: 21/km^{2} (55/sq mi)
- Time zone: UTC+01:00 (CET)
  - Summer (DST): UTC+02:00 (CEST)
- INSEE/Postal code: 71220 /71160
- ^{1} French Land Register data, which excludes lakes, ponds, glaciers > 1 km^{2} (0.386 sq mi or 247 acres) and river estuaries.

Gilly-sur-Loire (French pronunciation: [ʒili syʁ lwaʁ], literally Gilly on Loire) is a commune in the Saône-et-Loire department in the region of Bourgogne-Franche-Comté in eastern France.

== See also ==
- Communes of the Saône-et-Loire department
