= Vitry-sur-Loire =

- Commune
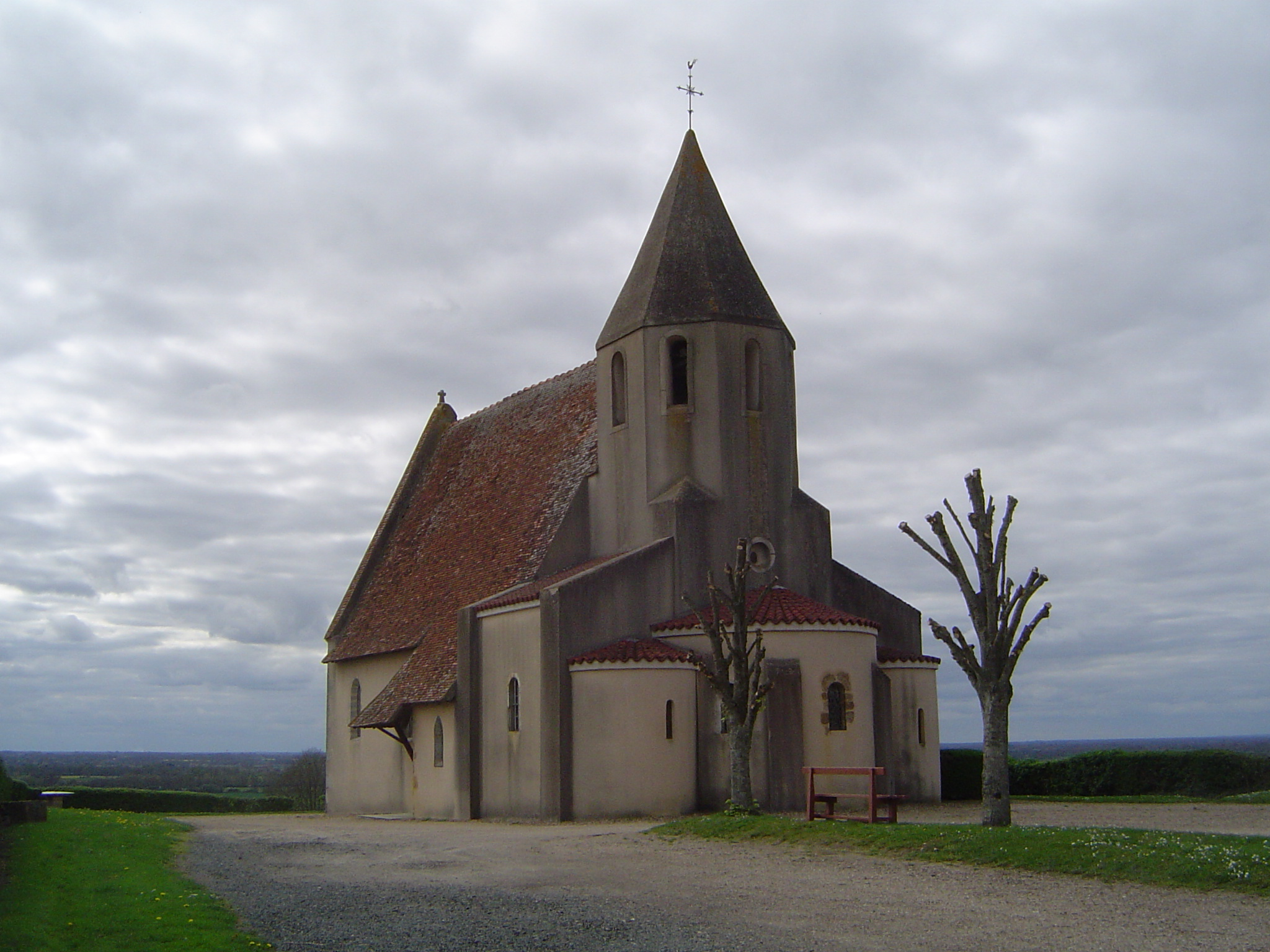
- The church in Vitry-sur-Loire

- Coat of arms
- Location of Vitry-sur-Loire
- Location within France Location within Bourgogne-Franche-Comté
- Coordinates: 46°40′56″N 3°42′30″E
- Country: France
- Region: Bourgogne-Franche-Comté
- Department: Saône-et-Loire
- Arrondissement: Charolles
- Canton: Digoin
- Intercommunality: Entre Arroux, Loire et Somme

Government
  - Mayor (2020–2026): Patrick Lhuilier
- Area^{1}: 27.38 km^{2} (10.57 sq mi)
- Elevation: 247 m (810 ft)
- Highest elevation: 271 m (889 ft)
- Lowest elevation: 199 m (653 ft)
- Population (2023): 428
  - Density: 15.6/km^{2} (40.5/sq mi)
- Time zone: UTC+01:00 (CET)
  - Summer (DST): UTC+02:00 (CEST)
- INSEE/Postal code: 71589 /71140
- ^{1} French Land Register data, which excludes lakes, ponds, glaciers > 1 km^{2} (0.386 sq mi or 247 acres) and river estuaries.

Vitry-sur-Loire (French pronunciation: [vitʁi syʁ lwaʁ], literally Vitry on Loire) is a commune in the Saône-et-Loire department in the region of Bourgogne-Franche-Comté in eastern France.

== Climate ==
On average, Vitry-sur-Loire experiences 67.7 days per year with a minimum temperature below 0 °C (32.0 °F), 1.6 days per year with a minimum temperature below −10 °C (14.0 °F), 7.8 days per year with a maximum temperature below 0 °C (32.0 °F), and 21.7 days per year with a maximum temperature above 30 °C (86.0 °F). The record high temperature was 42.8 °C (109.0 °F) on 27 June 2026, while the record low temperature was −21.5 °C (−6.7 °F) on January 16, 1985.

Climate data for Vitry-sur-Loire (1991–2020 normals, extremes 1983–present)
Month	Jan	Feb	Mar	Apr	May	Jun	Jul	Aug	Sep	Oct	Nov	Dec	Year
Record high °C (°F)	18.0 (64.4)	21.8 (71.2)	24.5 (76.1)	31.0 (87.8)	35.3 (95.5)	42.8 (109.0)	40.5 (104.9)	42.0 (107.6)	36.2 (97.2)	31.3 (88.3)	22.5 (72.5)	18.5 (65.3)	42.8 (109.0)
Mean daily maximum °C (°F)	6.7 (44.1)	8.2 (46.8)	13.0 (55.4)	16.3 (61.3)	20.7 (69.3)	24.3 (75.7)	26.7 (80.1)	26.6 (79.9)	21.9 (71.4)	17.0 (62.6)	10.5 (50.9)	7.1 (44.8)	16.6 (61.9)
Daily mean °C (°F)	3.6 (38.5)	4.2 (39.6)	7.9 (46.2)	10.5 (50.9)	14.6 (58.3)	18.0 (64.4)	20.1 (68.2)	20.0 (68.0)	15.9 (60.6)	12.3 (54.1)	7.0 (44.6)	4.1 (39.4)	11.5 (52.7)
Mean daily minimum °C (°F)	0.5 (32.9)	0.1 (32.2)	2.7 (36.9)	4.7 (40.5)	8.6 (47.5)	11.8 (53.2)	13.6 (56.5)	13.5 (56.3)	9.9 (49.8)	7.5 (45.5)	3.5 (38.3)	1.1 (34.0)	6.5 (43.6)
Record low °C (°F)	−21.5 (−6.7)	−13.5 (7.7)	−13.0 (8.6)	−6.0 (21.2)	−0.5 (31.1)	2.0 (35.6)	4.5 (40.1)	2.5 (36.5)	0.5 (32.9)	−7.5 (18.5)	−8.5 (16.7)	−13.2 (8.2)	−21.5 (−6.7)
Average precipitation mm (inches)	62.8 (2.47)	52.7 (2.07)	51.7 (2.04)	65.2 (2.57)	84.1 (3.31)	72.0 (2.83)	63.8 (2.51)	68.2 (2.69)	63.5 (2.50)	77.6 (3.06)	88.3 (3.48)	75.0 (2.95)	824.9 (32.48)
Average precipitation days (≥ 1.0 mm)	12.0	9.8	9.2	10.1	11.0	8.6	7.9	7.6	8.1	10.8	12.4	13.0	120.5
Source: Meteociel

== See also ==
- Communes of the Saône-et-Loire department
