= Cronat =

- Commune
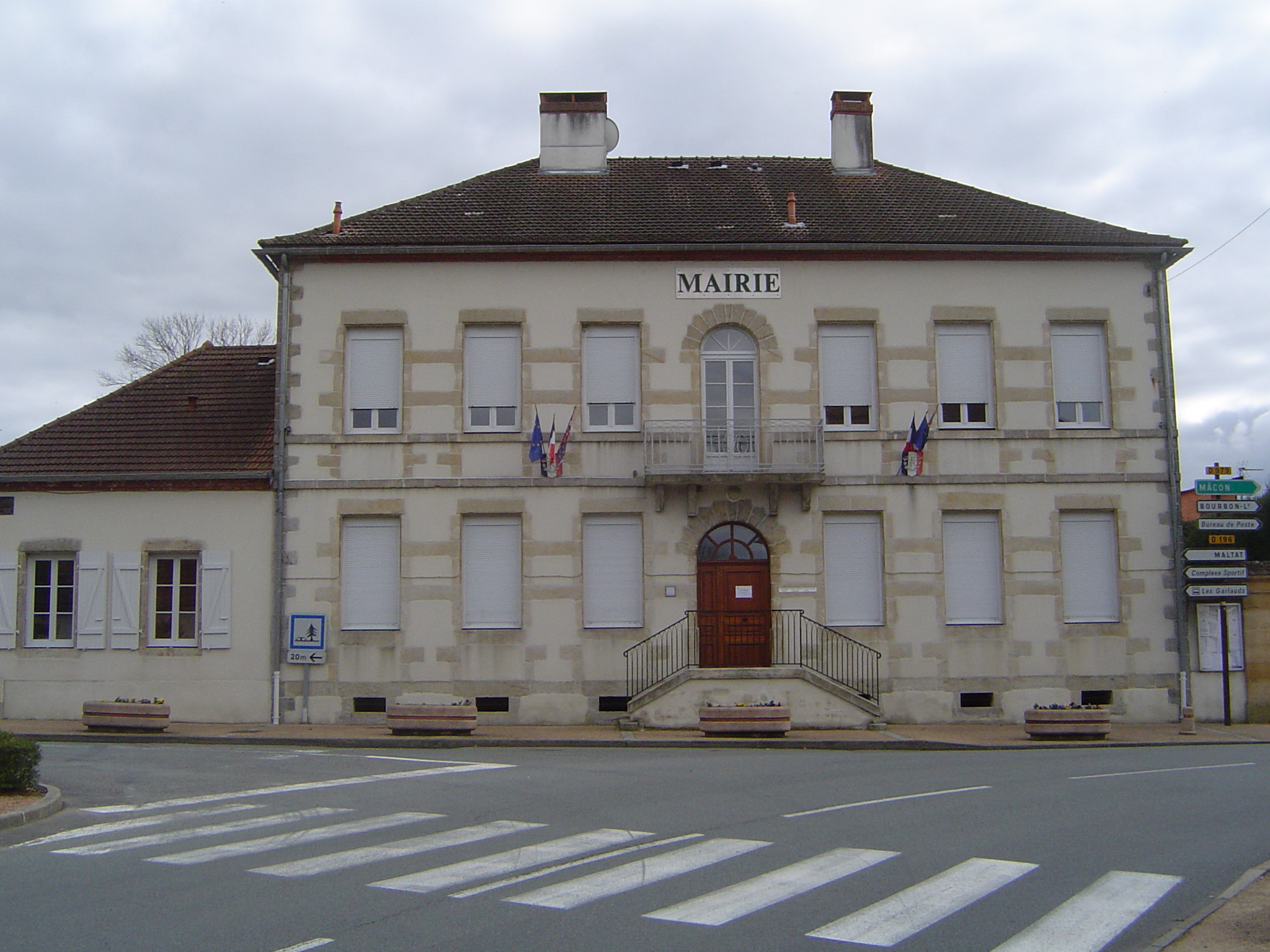
- Town hall
- Location of Cronat
- Location within France Location within Bourgogne-Franche-Comté
- Coordinates: 46°43′22″N 3°41′00″E
- Country: France
- Region: Bourgogne-Franche-Comté
- Department: Saône-et-Loire
- Arrondissement: Charolles
- Canton: Digoin

Government
  - Mayor (2020–2026): Georges Rousselet
- Area^{1}: 60.62 km^{2} (23.41 sq mi)
- Elevation: 204 m (669 ft)
- Highest elevation: 277 m (909 ft)
- Lowest elevation: 196 m (643 ft)
- Population (2023): 506
  - Density: 8.35/km^{2} (21.6/sq mi)
- Time zone: UTC+01:00 (CET)
  - Summer (DST): UTC+02:00 (CEST)
- INSEE/Postal code: 71155 /71140
- ^{1} French Land Register data, which excludes lakes, ponds, glaciers > 1 km^{2} (0.386 sq mi or 247 acres) and river estuaries.

Cronat (French pronunciation: [kʁɔna]) is a commune in the Saône-et-Loire department in the region of Bourgogne-Franche-Comté in eastern France.

== See also ==
- Communes of the Saône-et-Loire department
