= Chalmoux =

- Commune
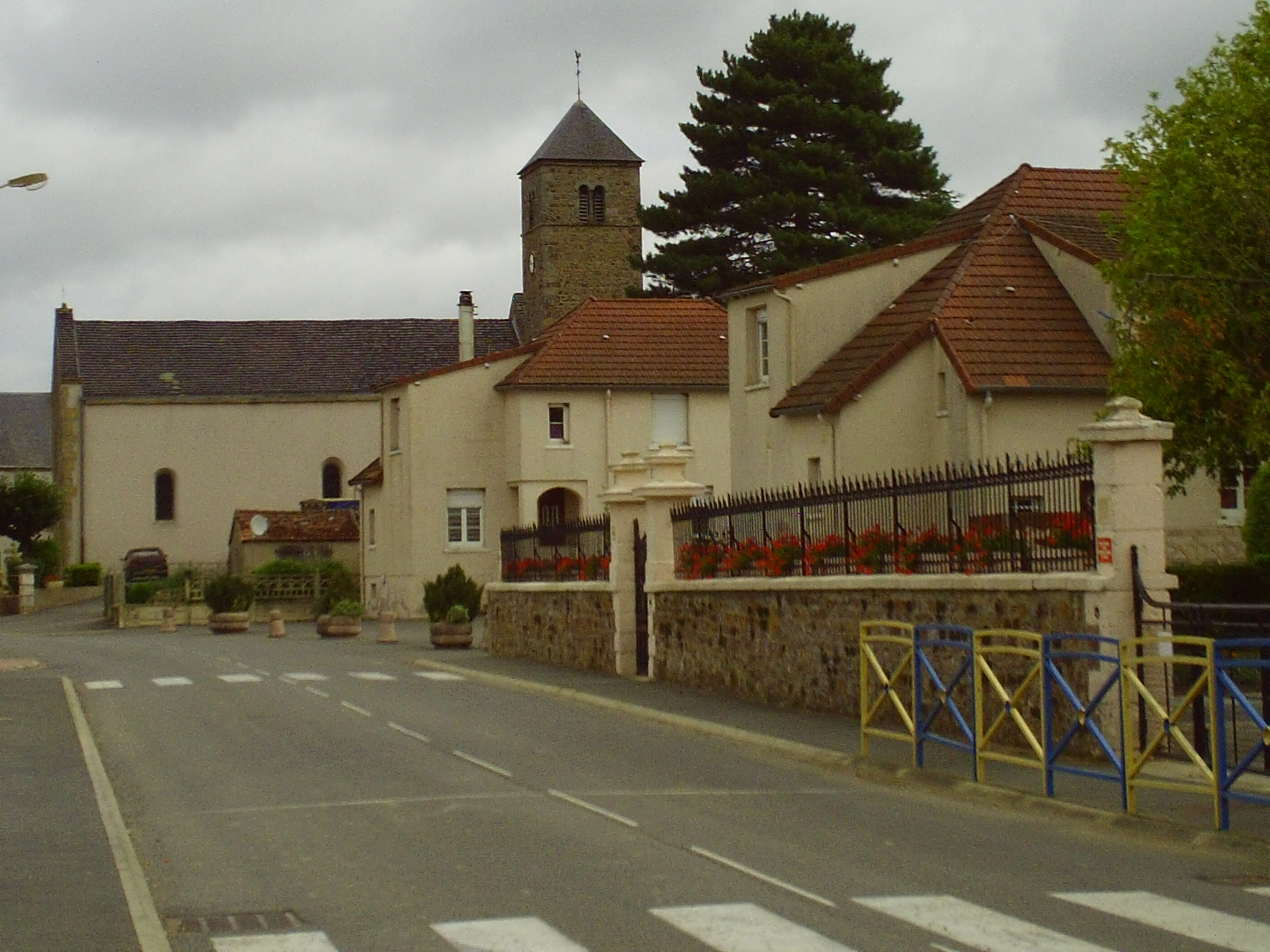
- The church and surroundings in Chalmoux

- Coat of arms
- Location of Chalmoux
- Location within France Location within Bourgogne-Franche-Comté
- Coordinates: 46°36′00″N 3°50′00″E
- Country: France
- Region: Bourgogne-Franche-Comté
- Department: Saône-et-Loire
- Arrondissement: Charolles
- Canton: Digoin

Government
  - Mayor (2020–2026): Christian Renaud
- Area^{1}: 38.47 km^{2} (14.85 sq mi)
- Elevation: 315 m (1,033 ft)
- Highest elevation: 388 m (1,273 ft)
- Lowest elevation: 242 m (794 ft)
- Population (2023): 639
  - Density: 16.6/km^{2} (43.0/sq mi)
- Time zone: UTC+01:00 (CET)
  - Summer (DST): UTC+02:00 (CEST)
- INSEE/Postal code: 71075 /71140
- ^{1} French Land Register data, which excludes lakes, ponds, glaciers > 1 km^{2} (0.386 sq mi or 247 acres) and river estuaries.

Chalmoux (French pronunciation: [ʃalmu]) is a commune in the Saône-et-Loire department in the region of Bourgogne-Franche-Comté in eastern France.

== See also ==
- Communes of the Saône-et-Loire department
