= Les Guerreaux =

- Commune
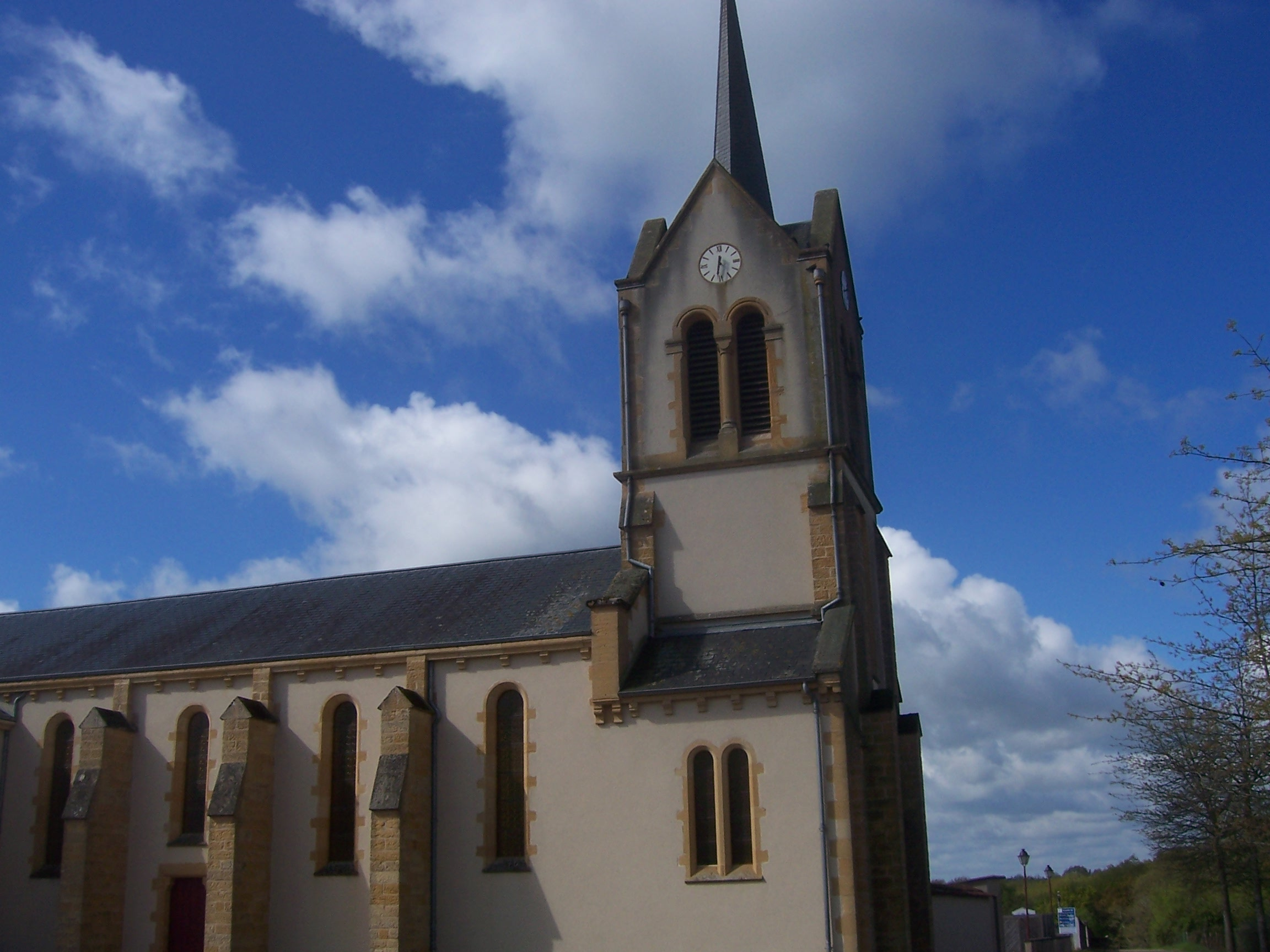
- The church in Les Guerreaux
- Location of Les Guerreaux
- Location within France Location within Bourgogne-Franche-Comté
- Coordinates: 46°32′07″N 3°55′24″E
- Country: France
- Region: Bourgogne-Franche-Comté
- Department: Saône-et-Loire
- Arrondissement: Charolles
- Canton: Digoin
- Area^{1}: 20.01 km^{2} (7.73 sq mi)
- Elevation: 328 m (1,076 ft)
- Highest elevation: 347 m (1,138 ft)
- Lowest elevation: 242 m (794 ft)
- Population (2023): 226
  - Density: 11.3/km^{2} (29.3/sq mi)
- Time zone: UTC+01:00 (CET)
  - Summer (DST): UTC+02:00 (CEST)
- INSEE/Postal code: 71229 /71160
- ^{1} French Land Register data, which excludes lakes, ponds, glaciers > 1 km^{2} (0.386 sq mi or 247 acres) and river estuaries.

Les Guerreaux (French pronunciation: [le ɡɛʁo]) is a commune in the Saône-et-Loire department in the region of Bourgogne-Franche-Comté in eastern France.

== See also ==
- Communes of the Saône-et-Loire department
