= Mont, Saône-et-Loire =

Mont
- Commune
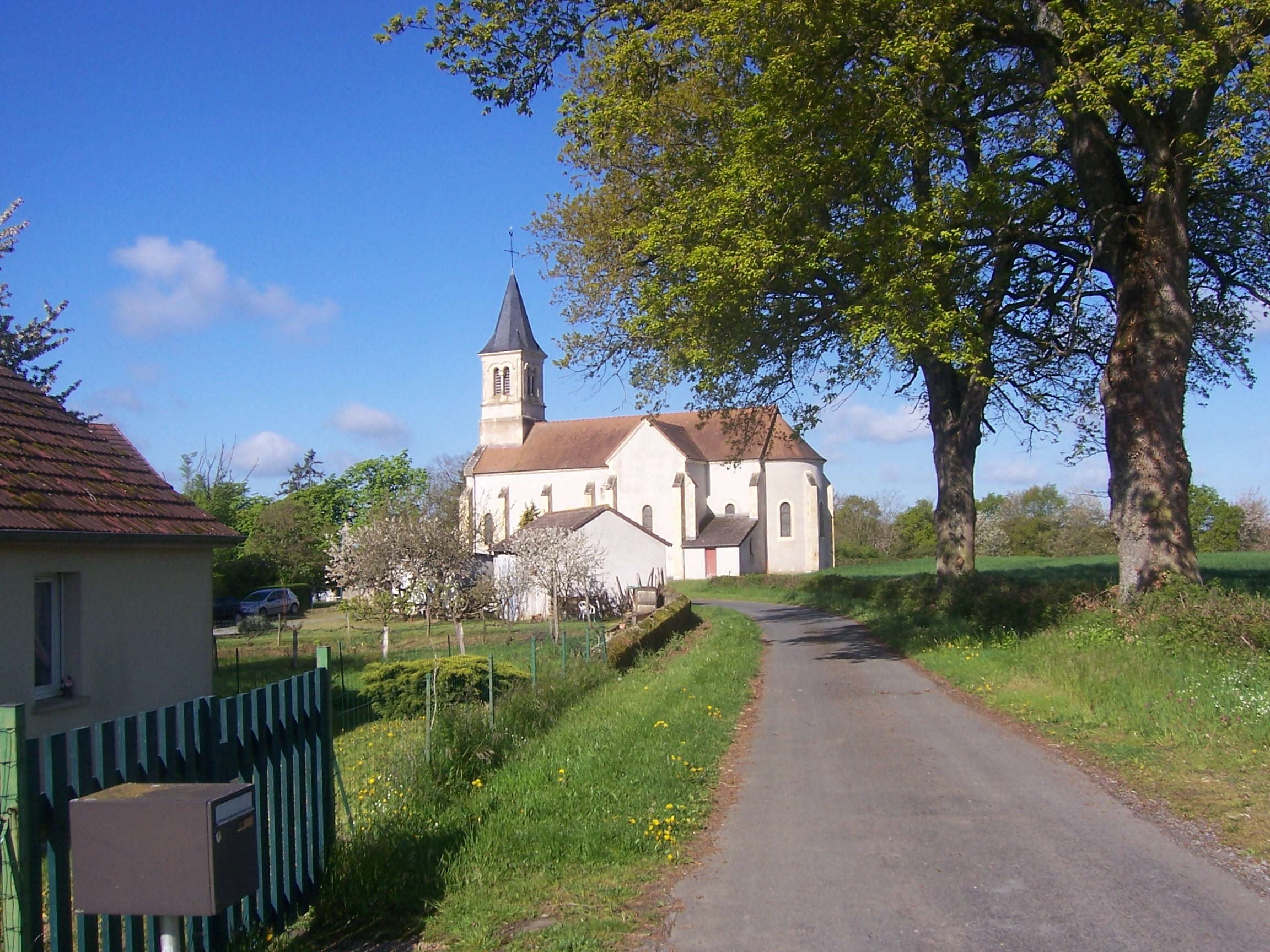
- The church in Mont
- Location of Mont
- Location within France Location within Bourgogne-Franche-Comté
- Coordinates: 46°37′00″N 3°50′00″E
- Country: France
- Region: Bourgogne-Franche-Comté
- Department: Saône-et-Loire
- Arrondissement: Charolles
- Canton: Digoin

Government
  - Mayor (2020–2026): Patrick Mousserin
- Area^{1}: 16.18 km^{2} (6.25 sq mi)
- Elevation: 350 m (1,150 ft)
- Highest elevation: 466 m (1,529 ft)
- Lowest elevation: 248 m (814 ft)
- Population (2023): 173
  - Density: 10.7/km^{2} (27.7/sq mi)
- Time zone: UTC+01:00 (CET)
  - Summer (DST): UTC+02:00 (CEST)
- INSEE/Postal code: 71301 /71140
- ^{1} French Land Register data, which excludes lakes, ponds, glaciers > 1 km^{2} (0.386 sq mi or 247 acres) and river estuaries.

Mont (French pronunciation: [mɔ̃]) is a commune in the Saône-et-Loire department in the region of Bourgogne-Franche-Comté in eastern France.

== See also ==
- Communes of the Saône-et-Loire department
