= Saint-Aubin-sur-Loire =

- Commune
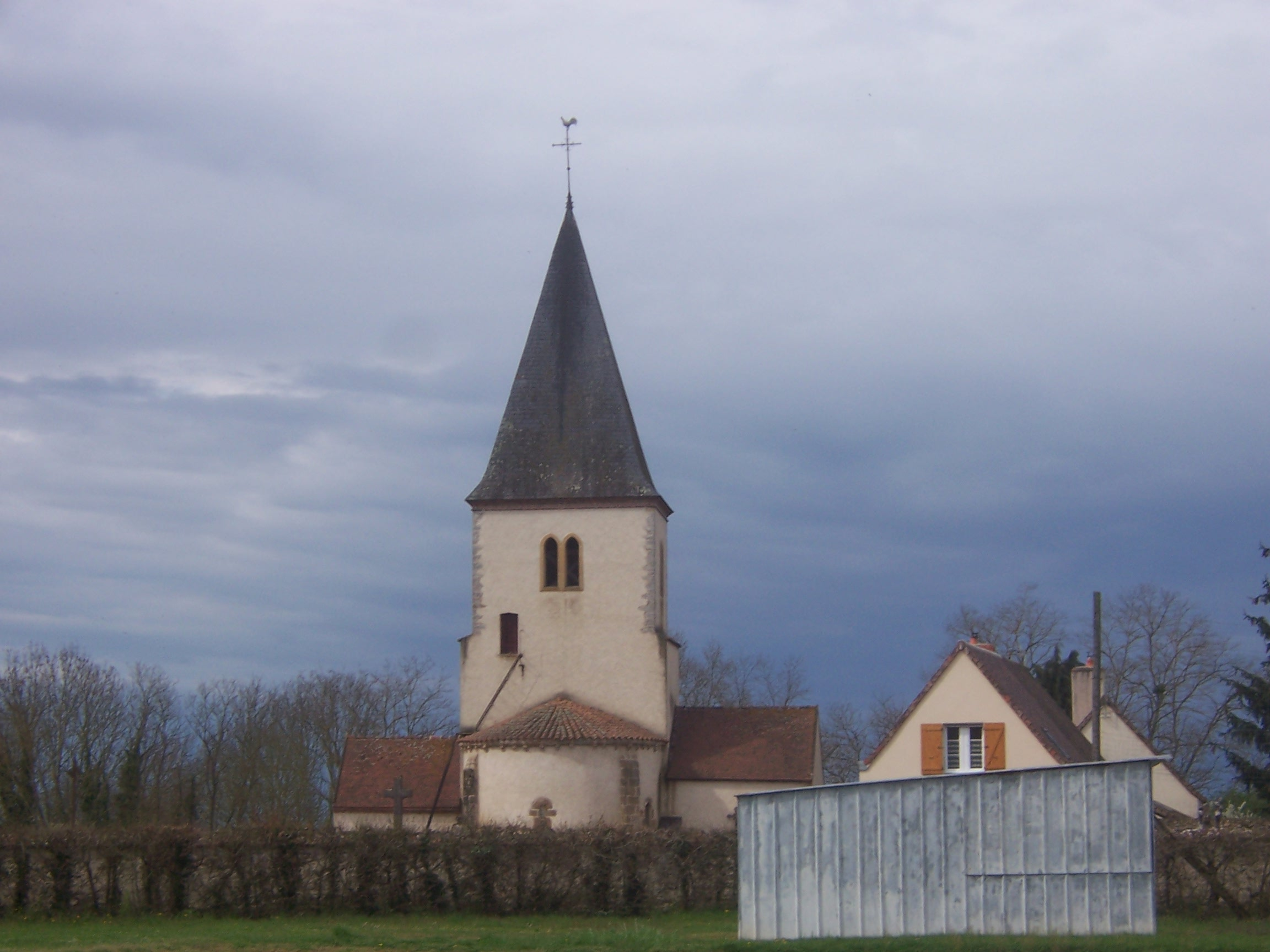
- The church in Saint-Aubin-sur-Loire
- Location of Saint-Aubin-sur-Loire
- Location within France Location within Bourgogne-Franche-Comté
- Coordinates: 46°34′00″N 3°45′00″E
- Country: France
- Region: Bourgogne-Franche-Comté
- Department: Saône-et-Loire
- Arrondissement: Charolles
- Canton: Digoin

Government
  - Mayor (2020–2026): Georges Bardot
- Area^{1}: 10.86 km^{2} (4.19 sq mi)
- Elevation: 232 m (761 ft)
- Highest elevation: 311 m (1,020 ft)
- Lowest elevation: 207 m (679 ft)
- Population (2023): 262
  - Density: 24.1/km^{2} (62.5/sq mi)
- Time zone: UTC+01:00 (CET)
  - Summer (DST): UTC+02:00 (CEST)
- INSEE/Postal code: 71389 /71140
- ^{1} French Land Register data, which excludes lakes, ponds, glaciers > 1 km^{2} (0.386 sq mi or 247 acres) and river estuaries.

Saint-Aubin-sur-Loire (French pronunciation: [sɛ̃.t‿obɛ̃ syʁ lwaʁ], literally Saint-Aubin on Loire) is a commune in the Saône-et-Loire department in the region of Bourgogne-Franche-Comté in eastern France.

== See also ==
- Communes of the Saône-et-Loire department
