= Président à mortier =

Legal post of France's ancien regime

The président à mortier (French pronunciation: [pʁezidɑ̃t‿a mɔʁtje]) was one of the most important legal posts of the French Ancien Régime. The présidents were principal magistrates of the highest juridical institutions, the parlements, which were the appeal courts.

They numbered 11 in 1789. They were spread over chambers, comprising those who were counsellor to the parliament, who assessed and dispensed justice, and présidents who chaired sessions.

The most important chamber was the Grand'Chambre. Its presidents, to mark their status as superior to that the presidents of lower chambers, took the mortier, a black velvet toque with two gold braid ribbons.

The position was venal, being freely bought, sold and inherited, subject to payments to the King. In practice, the parlements' consent was needed, and a law examination was required. This limited candidates to those with an academic background in law. After 20 years, the position brought entry to the noblesse, but in fact, the purchase of the office ensured that it was held only by nobles.

Typically, the presidents served under a premier président, who was a royal appointee, not a purchaser of the office. This led to constant tensions.
