= Beatification of Pope John Paul II =

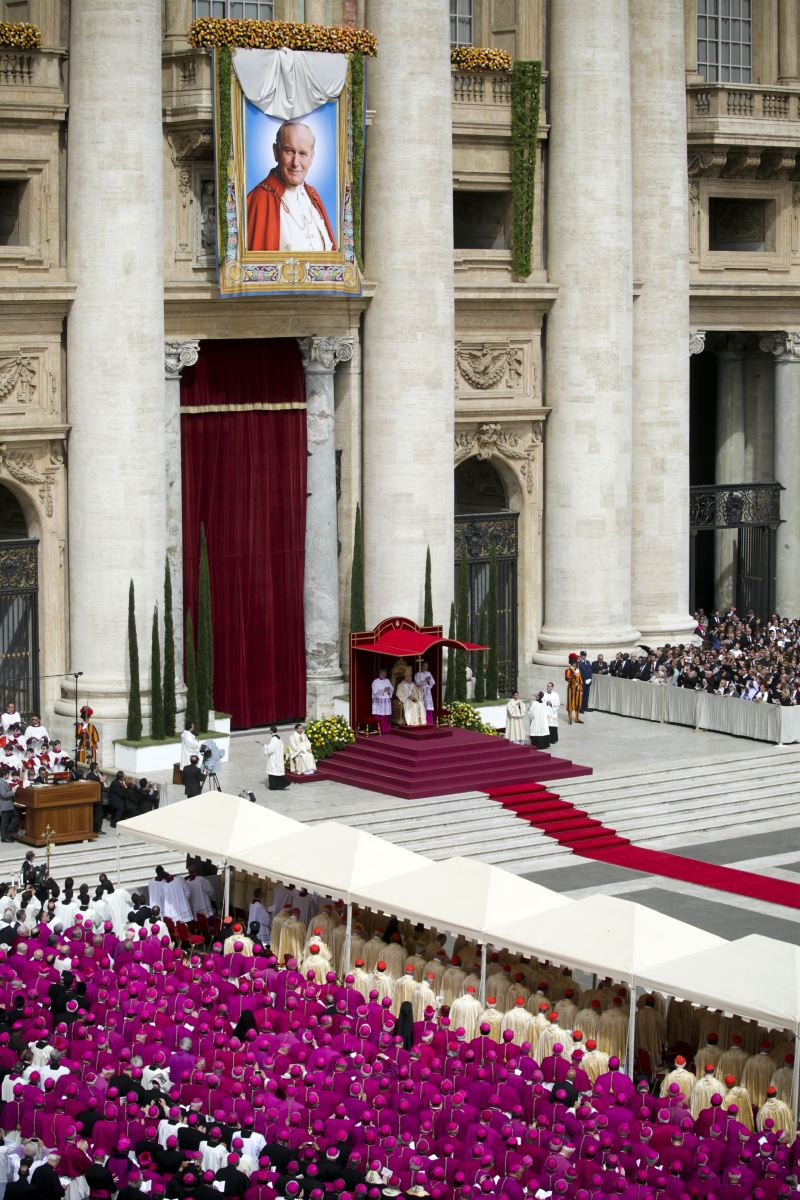
Following the sacred formula of beatification, the banner revealing an image of a smiling John Paul II was unfurled on the Central Loggia of St. Peter's Basilica.

Pope John Paul II reigned as pope of the Catholic Church and sovereign of the Vatican City State for 26 years from October 1978 to his death, on 2 April 2005. Since his death, many thousands of people supported the case for beatifying and canonising Pope John Paul II as a saint. His formal beatification ceremony took place on 1 May 2011.

== Beatification ==
John Paul II's official title was "Bishop of Rome, Vicar of Jesus Christ, Successor of Saint Peter, Head of the College of Bishops, Supreme Pontiff of the Universal Church, Patriarch of the West, Primate of Italy, Archbishop and Metropolitan of the Roman Province, Sovereign of the State of the Vatican City, Servus Servorum Dei, Pope John Paul II". In 2006 the title Patriarch of the West was removed from the papal list of titles by the succeeding pope, Benedict XVI, due to its obsolescence.

On 9 May 2005, Benedict XVI began the beatification process for his predecessor. Normally five years must pass after a person's death before the beatification process can begin. However, in an audience with Pope Benedict XVI, Cardinal Vicar Camillo Ruini, the one responsible for promoting the cause for canonisation of any person who dies within the diocese of Rome, cited "exceptional circumstances" which suggested that the waiting period could be waived.

The "exceptional circumstances" may possibly refer to the people's cries of "Santo Subito!" ("Saint now!" in Italian) during the pontiff's funeral. Therefore, the new pope waived the five year rule "so that the cause of Beatification and Canonisation of the same Servant of God can begin immediately". The decision was announced on 13 May 2005, the Feast of Our Lady of Fátima and the 24th anniversary of the assassination attempt on John Paul II at St. Peter's Square. John Paul II often credited Our Lady of Fátima for preserving him on that day. Cardinal Camillo Ruini, vicar general for the diocese of Rome, officially opened the cause for beatification in the Lateran Basilica on 28 June 2005.

In early 2006, it was reported that the Vatican was investigating a possible miracle associated with John Paul II. Sister Marie Simon-Pierre, a French nun confined to her bed by Parkinson's disease, was reported to have woken up free of symptoms on 2 June 2005, "after members of her community prayed for the intercession of Pope John Paul II". A member of the Congregation of Little Sisters of Catholic Motherhood from Puyricard, near Aix-en-Provence, Simon-Pierre returned to work at a maternity hospital run by her order. She met reporters 30 March 2006 in Aix-en-Provence, during a press conference with Archbishop of Aix Claude Feidt, saying "I am cured, but it is up to the church to say whether it was a miracle or not".

However, Polish newspaper Rzeczpospolita reported that Simon-Pierre had a relapse of her symptoms in 2010, and suggested that Simon-Pierre did not have Parkinson's but a neurological condition with similar symptoms that could go into remission or be cured, noting that there is no easy way to accurately diagnose the disease short of medical autopsy. The Episcopal Conference of France disputed that the relapse (which would have thrown the purportedly miraculous nature of the cure into doubt) was anything more than a rumour.

On 28 May 2006, Pope Benedict XVI said Mass before an estimated 900,000 people in John Paul II's native Poland. During his homily he encouraged prayers for the early canonisation of John Paul II and stated that he hoped canonisation would happen "in the near future".

In January 2007, it was announced by Cardinal Stanisław Dziwisz of Kraków, his former secretary, that the key interviewing phase in Italy and Poland of the beatification process was nearing completion. The relics of Pope John Paul II—pieces of white papal cassocks he used to wear—were being freely distributed with prayer cards for the cause to interested parties; this distribution and prayerful use of relics is a typical praiseworthy pious practice after a saintly Catholic's death.

On 8 March 2007 the Vicariate of Rome announced that the diocesan phase of John Paul's cause for beatification was at an end. Following a ceremony on 2 April 2007 – the second anniversary of the Pontiff's death – the cause proceeded to the scrutiny of the committee of lay, clerical, and episcopal members of the Vatican's Congregation for the Causes of Saints, who will conduct an investigation of their own. On the fourth anniversary of Pope John Paul's death, 2 April 2009, Dziwisz told reporters of a presumed miracle that had recently occurred at the former pope's tomb in St. Peter's Basilica. A nine-year-old Polish boy from Gdańsk, who had kidney cancer and was completely unable to walk, had been visiting the tomb with his parents. On leaving St. Peter's Basilica, the boy told them, "I want to walk", and began walking normally.

In October 2009, Rome's mayor Gianni Alemanno said that the beatification, likely to draw huge crowds, was expected to take place in 2010, but on 4 November 2009 Monsignor Slawomir Oder, postulator of the cause of beatification, said that it was not yet known when study of the case could be concluded.

On 16 November 2009, a panel of reviewers at the Congregation for the Causes of Saints voted unanimously that Pope John Paul II had lived a life of virtue. On Saturday, 19 December 2009, Pope Benedict XVI signed the first of two decrees needed for beatification. This decree recognises that Pope John Paul II lived a heroic, virtuous life and enables him to be called "Venerable", the next step in the sainthood process. The second vote and the second signed decree, signed by Pope Benedict XVI on 1 May 2011, recognises the authenticity of Pope John Paul II's first miracle. Following the signing of the second decree, the positio (the report on the cause, with documentation about his life and his writings and with information on the cause) is regarded as being complete. He can then be beatified.

Prior to the announcement of the beatification, some ecclesiastical authorities had expressed concern that the cure of Sister Marie-Simon-Pierre, and perhaps the cure of the boy who had cancer, may not be complete and lasting, as it has not been that long since the supposed miracles. Another reported miracle was that of Floribeth Mora Diaz. She was a Costa Rican lawyer who was cured of an incurable brain aneurysm. In this case, neurosurgeons were consulted by the authorities at the Vatican. Diaz was invited to the beatification ceremony.

=== Ceremony ===
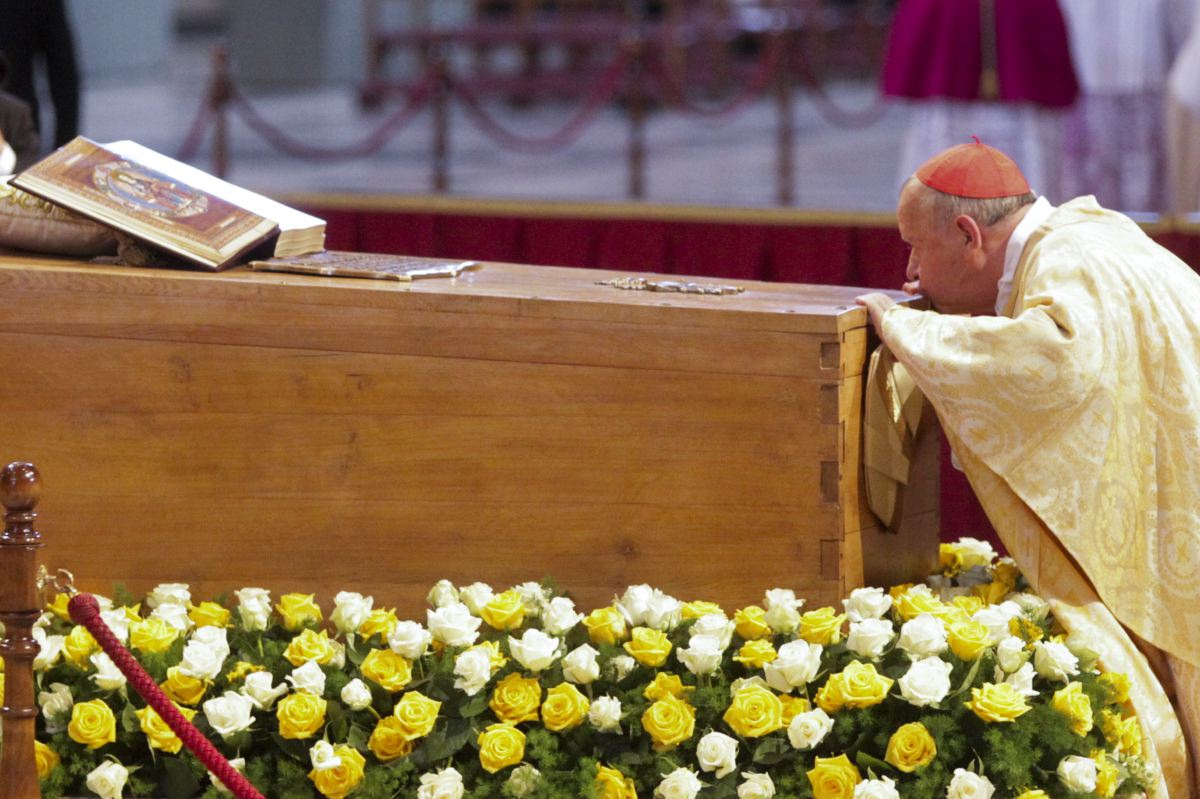
Cardinal Stanisław Dziwisz kisses the casket of John Paul II.

The beatification ceremony of Pope John Paul II was held on 1 May 2011 and was presided over by Pope Benedict XVI. A vigil in preparation for the celebration was held the night before in the Circus Maximus. The casket in which he was interred was exhumed and placed before Saint Peter's tomb on 29 April 2011. It was placed in front of the main altar for public veneration during the ceremony. After the ceremony, the casket was reinterred in the Chapel of St Sebastian. A vial containing the Pope's blood, taken during the final days of his life, was displayed as a relic for veneration. The reliquary in which the vial was kept during the ceremony was carried by Sister Marie, and Sister Tobiann (who nursed the Pope during his illness).

A total of 87 international delegations attended the ceremony, including 22 world leaders. Amid controversy, President Robert Mugabe of Zimbabwe also attended the ceremony despite a European Union-wide travel ban imposed on him. He was able to travel freely into the Vatican via Rome due to a treaty that allows individuals wanting to travel to the Vatican to pass through Italy. His travel ban was waived by the EU.

One million Catholics gathered for the mass at Saint Peter's Square, where a giant portrait of the former Pope was set up. The Prefecture of the Papal Household, Bishop James Michael Harvey, has issued a draft program for the Beatification of John Paul II, describing it as "a great ecclesial event", the office in charge of organising audiences and handles ticketing for all papal events at the Vatican, issued a statement that began "tickets are not needed to attend the beatification ceremony".

The city of Rome plastered 30,000 posters around the city. A no-fly zone was enforced over Saint Peter's Square.

On 2 May 2011, following a two-day viewing by hundreds of thousands of pilgrims, John Paul II's coffin was sealed within St Peters under the Altar of St. Sebastian.

== Criticism of beatification ==
Some Catholics question the validity of the beatification. Calling into question both the validity of the purported miracle and also asking whether the purported miracle should be attributed to John Paul II rather than the prayers of Sister Marie Simon-Pierre to any other saint. There has been criticism of the rapidity of the beatification in light of the sexual abuse scandals.

Much of the abuse, or its alleged cover-up, occurred while John Paul II was Pope, from 1979 to 2005, and the Church has been criticised for not doing enough to punish those found responsible.

John Paul II has been criticised (more than perhaps any other issue) for not recognising the full severity of the sex abuse cases until they erupted in America in 2002. He has also been criticised for hindering the investigation into the charges of sexual immorality leveled against Father Marcial Maciel Degollado and for allowing diocesan bishops to transfer pedophile priests from one parish to another instead of reporting their crimes to the authorities. John Paul further stands accused of hindering Cardinal Joseph Ratzinger who allegedly was attempting to prevent sex abuse.

Meanwhile, Pope Benedict stands accused of deliberately hushing up the abundance of public and private affection displayed between John Paul II and Father Marciel. According to the National Catholic Reporter, a recent leak of 212 Vatican documents shows a fuller story:

"Ratzinger wanted to elevate John Paul to beatification," said [José] Barba, coauthor of La Voluntad de No Saber ("The Will Not to Know"), an analysis of Vatican documents on Maciel [leaked in late 2011]. The book's publication last March [2012] and Benedict's refusal to meet with Maciel victims on a trip to Mexico [in the very same month] ignited an onslaught of bad press for the pope. Benedict had to reckon with the embarrassment of John Paul's praise of Maciel after the 1998 case, in essence scoffing at allegations against one of the most notorious sexual criminals in church history. By keeping a lid on Maciel's secret life, Barba said, Benedict hoped "to defend the sainthood case against the accusations that John Paul protected predators."

After the formal beatification ceremony on 1 May 2011, Pope Benedict could be more forthcoming in acknowledging the depth of Father Marciel's crimes. Meanwhile, Jason Berry has documented how the million dollar gifts of Father Marciel to John Paul II served to cement their friendship and to assure Marciel of papal immunity from prosecution.

== List of dignitaries at the beatification ==
- Albania: President Bamir Topi
- Belgium: The King of the Belgians and Queen Paola
- Brazil: Vice-President Michel Temer, representing President Dilma Rousseff
- Bulgaria: Chairwoman of the National Assembly Tsetska Tsacheva
- Congo: President Denis Sassou Nguesso
- Estonia: President Toomas Hendrik Ilves
- European Union: President of the European Commission José Manuel Barroso, President of the European Council Herman Van Rompuy, President of the European Parliament Jerzy Buzek
- France: Prime Minister François Fillon
- Honduras: President Porfirio Lobo Sosa
- Hungary: Prime Minister Viktor Orbán
- Ireland: Government Chief Whip Paul Kehoe
- Israel: Minister without portfolio Yossi Peled
- Italy: President Giorgio Napolitano, President of the Senate Renato Schifani, President of the Chamber of Deputies Gianfranco Fini, and Prime Minister Silvio Berlusconi
- Lithuania: Prime Minister Andrius Kubilius
- Mexico: President of Mexico Felipe Calderón
- Palestinian Authority: Minister without portfolio Ziad El Bandak
- Poland: President Bronisław Komorowski, former president and leader of Solidarity, Lech Wałęsa
- Spain: The Prince and Princess of Asturias, Minister of the Presidency Ramón Jauregui
- Republic of China: Minister of the Interior Jiang Yi-huah, representing President Ma Ying-jeou
- United Kingdom: The Duke and Duchess of Gloucester, representing Queen Elizabeth II
- Zimbabwe: President Robert Mugabe

== Title "the Great" ==
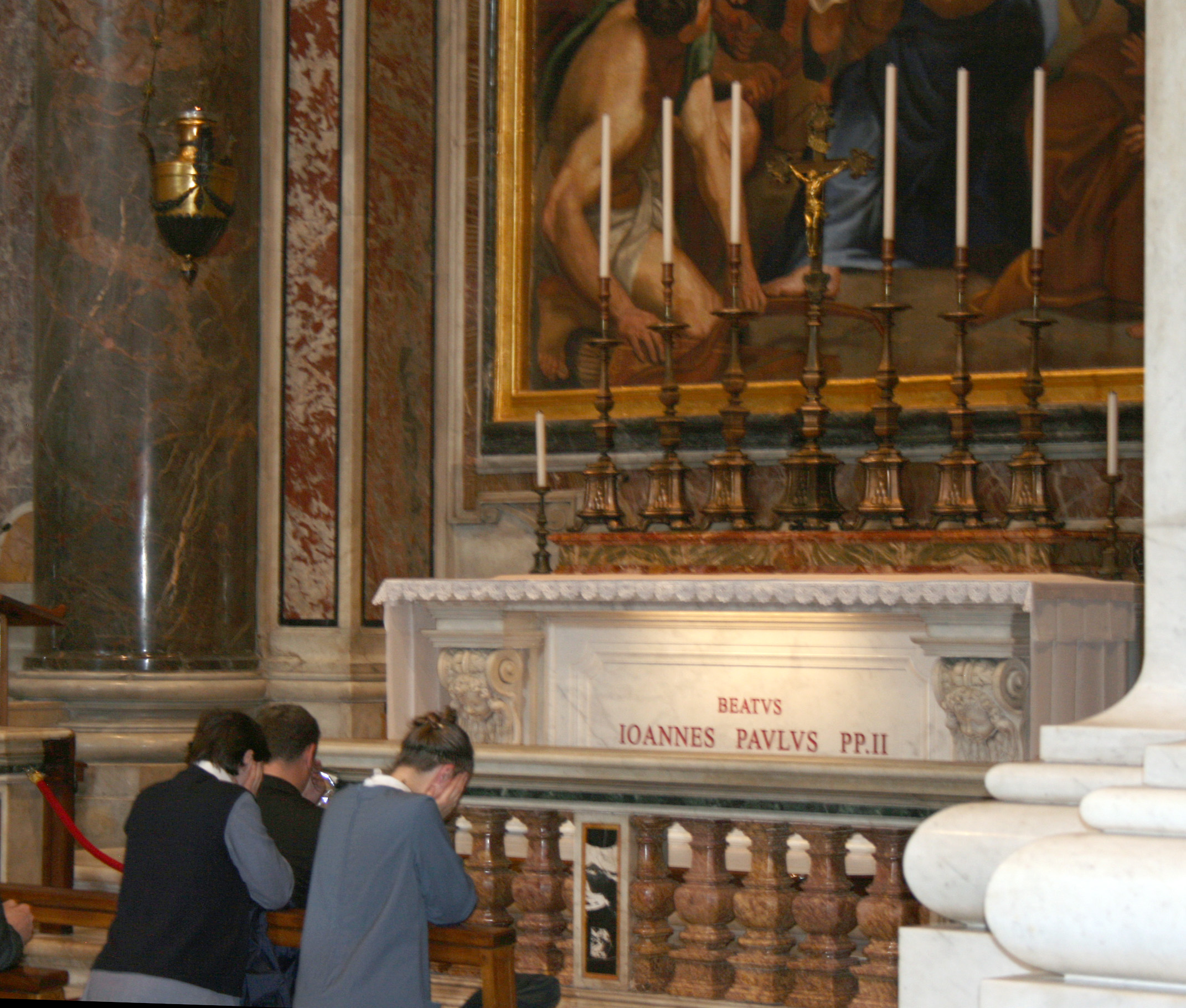
Tomb of John Paul II in The Chapel of St. Sebastian

Since the death of John Paul II, a number of clergy at the Vatican and laymen throughout the world have been referring to the pontiff as "John Paul the Great"—only the fourth pope to be so acclaimed, and the first since the first millennium. Scholars of Canon Law say that there is no official process for declaring a pope "Great"; the title simply establishes itself through popular and continued usage. The three popes who today commonly are known as "Great" are: Leo I, who reigned from 440 to 461 and persuaded Attila the Hun to withdraw from Rome; Gregory I, 590–604, after whom the Gregorian Chant is named; and Pope Nicholas I, 858–867.

His successor, Pope Benedict XVI, referred to him as "the great Pope John Paul II" in his first address from the loggia of St Peter's Basilica, and he referred to Pope John Paul II as "the Great" in his published written homily for the Mass of Repose.

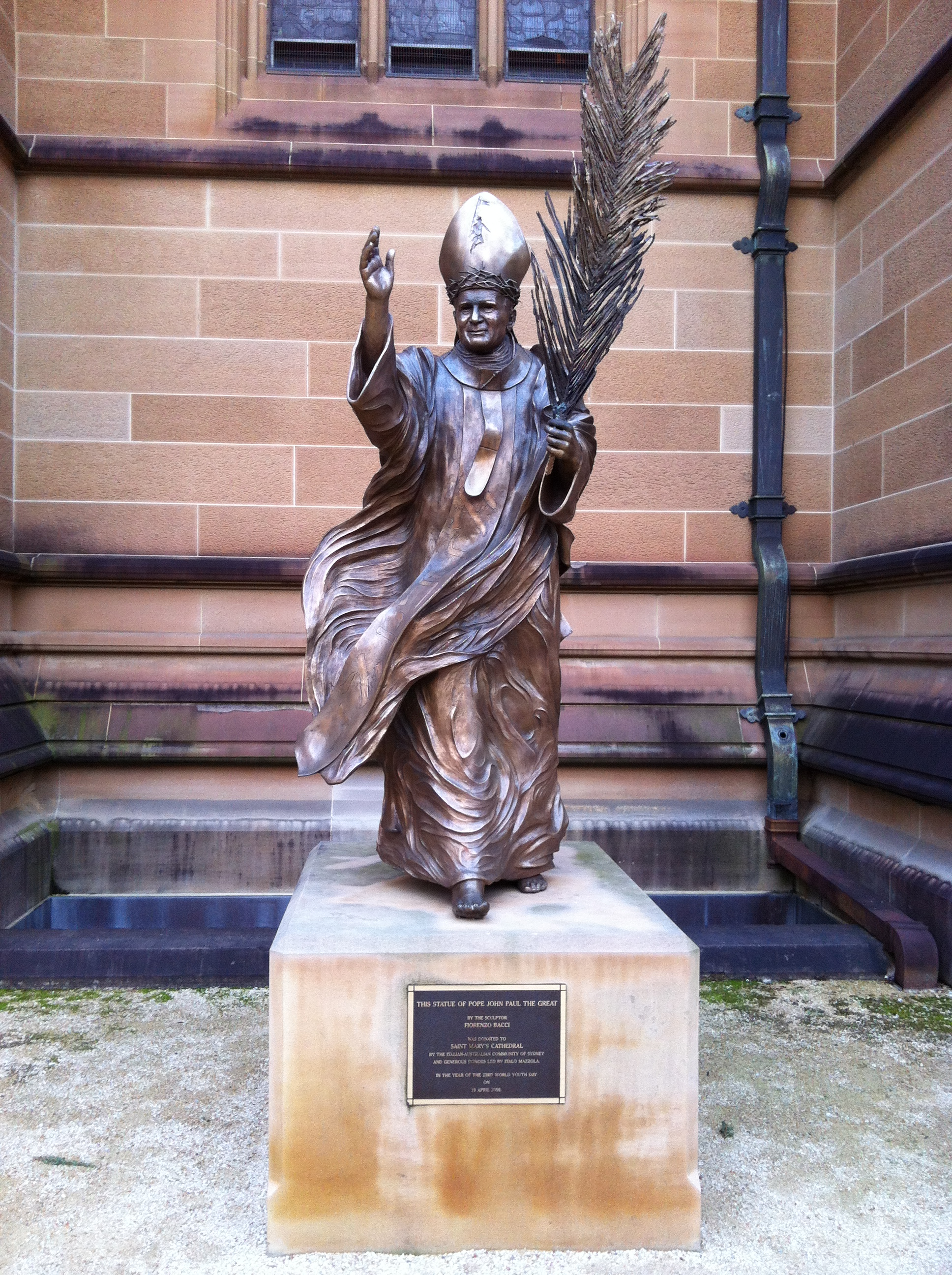
The Statue of Pope John Paul the Great in Sydney, Australia

Since giving his homily at the funeral of Pope John Paul II, Pope Benedict XVI continued to refer to John Paul II as "the Great". At the 2005 World Youth Day in Germany, Pope Benedict XVI, speaking in Polish, John Paul's native language, said, "As the great Pope John Paul II would say: keep the flame of faith alive in your lives and your people". In May 2006, Pope Benedict XVI visited John Paul's native Poland. During that visit he repeatedly made references to "the great John Paul" and "my great predecessor".

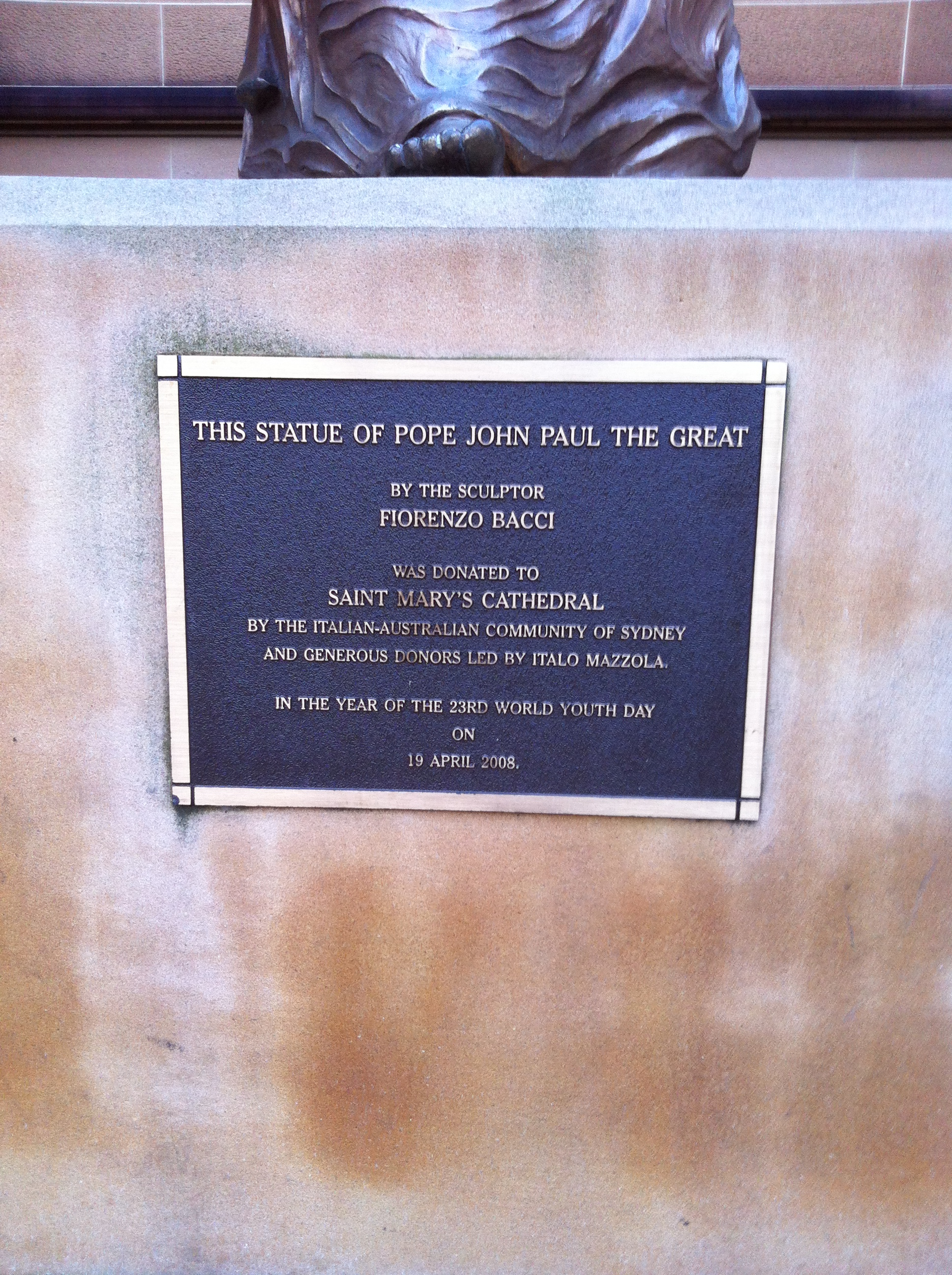
The plaque marking the statue of John Paul the Great

In addition to the Vatican calling him "the great", numerous books and newspapers have also done so. Journalist Peggy Noonan readily titled her book John Paul the Great: Remembering a Spiritual Father, and Catholic writer Randall Meissen subtitles his book about the pope's influence on Catholic culture, The Spiritual Sons of John Paul the Great. Also, the Italian newspaper Corriere della Sera called him "the Greatest" and the South African Catholic newspaper, The Southern Cross, has called him "John Paul II The Great".
