= Hôtel de Boadès =

Coordinates: 43.5270°N 5.4443°E

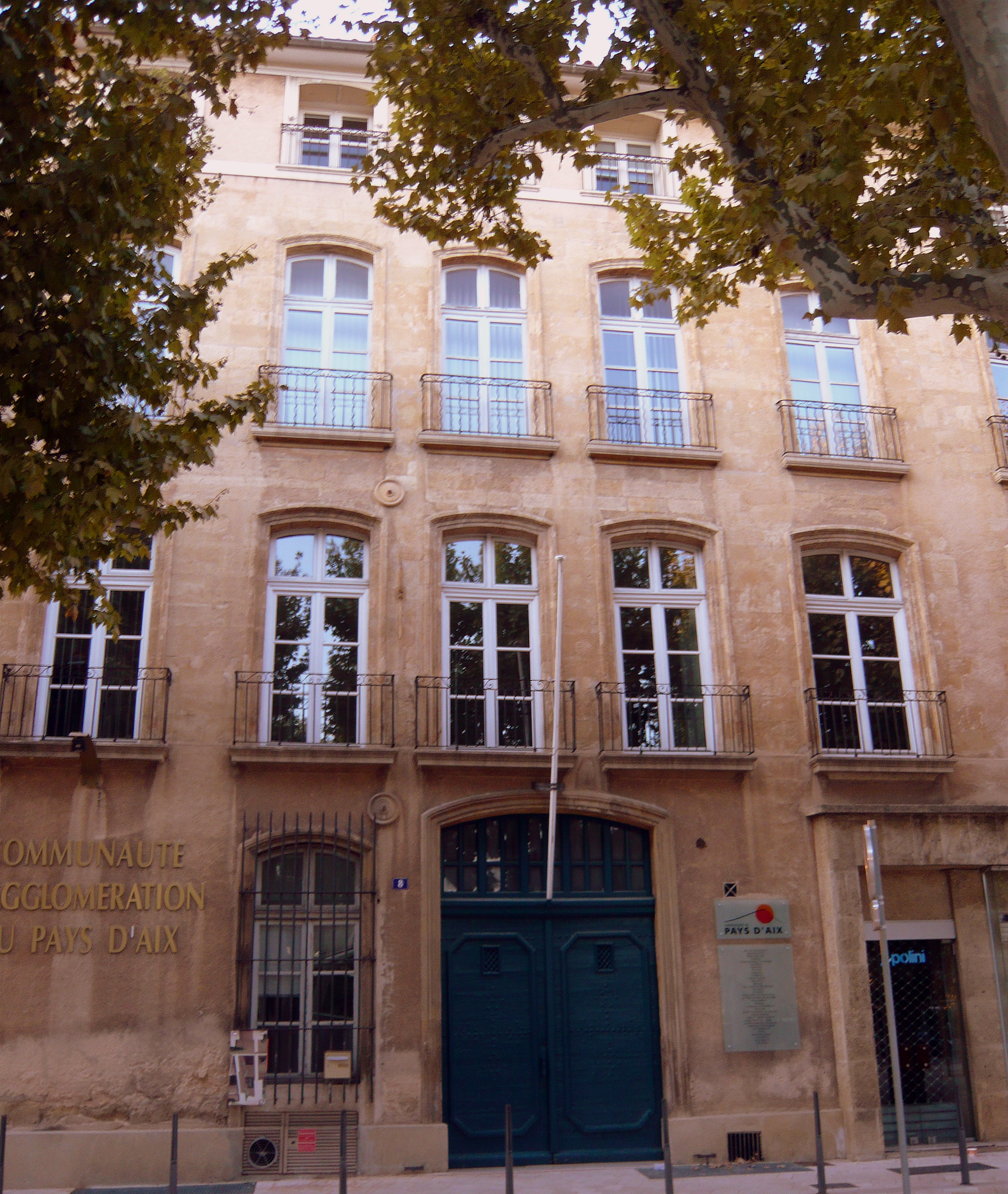
- Interactive map of the Hôtel de Boadès area

General information
- Type: Hôtel particulier
- Location: 8, places Jeanne d'Arc, Aix-en-Provence, France

The Hôtel de Boadès is a listed hôtel particulier in Aix-en-Provence.

== Location ==
It is located at 8, place Jeanne d'Arc in the center of Aix-en-Provence.

== History ==
In 1935, Blanche d'Estienne de Saint Jean, an heiress to the Château du Grand-Saint-Jean, donated it the city of Aix-en-Provence and asked them to donate the proceeds to the Academy of Aix-en-Provence.

It is now home to city administration offices.

== Heritage significance ==
It has been listed as a historical building since 1947.
