= Jean Cabassut =

French theologian (1604–1685)

Jean Cabassut (Cabassutius) (1604 – 25 September 1685) was a French Oratorian theologian.

== Life ==
He was born at Aix and entered the Oratory at the age of twenty-one. Though devoted to his labour he was always ready to interrupt even his most favourite study to assist the needy. He had taught canon law at Avignon for some time, when Cardinal Grimaldi, Archbishop of Aix, took him as a companion to Rome, where Father Cabassut remained about eighteen months.

Returning to Aix, where he spent the rest of his life, he became a distinguished writer on questions of ecclesiastical history, canon law, and moral theology.

== Works ==
Saint Alphonsus considers him classical. He was a probabiliorist in his moral solutions.

The following of his works are worthy of note:

- "Notitia Conciliorum" (Lyons, 1668).

Cardinal Grimaldi induced the writer to enlarge this work and publish it under the title, "Notitia ecclesiastica historiarum, conciliorum et canonum invicem collatorum", etc. (Lyons, 1680, and other dates; Munich, 1758; Tournai, 1851, 3 vols.). Often modified and enlarged, it was once, under the title "Cabassutius", an authority for the history of councils. A compendium of the "Notitia" appeared at Louvain, 1776.

- "Theoria et Praxis Juris Canonici" etc. (Lyons, 1660, and other dates; Rouen, 1703; Venice, 1757).
