= Hôtel de Ville, Cagnes-sur-Mer =

Town hall in Cagnes-sur-Mer, France

Hôtel de Ville
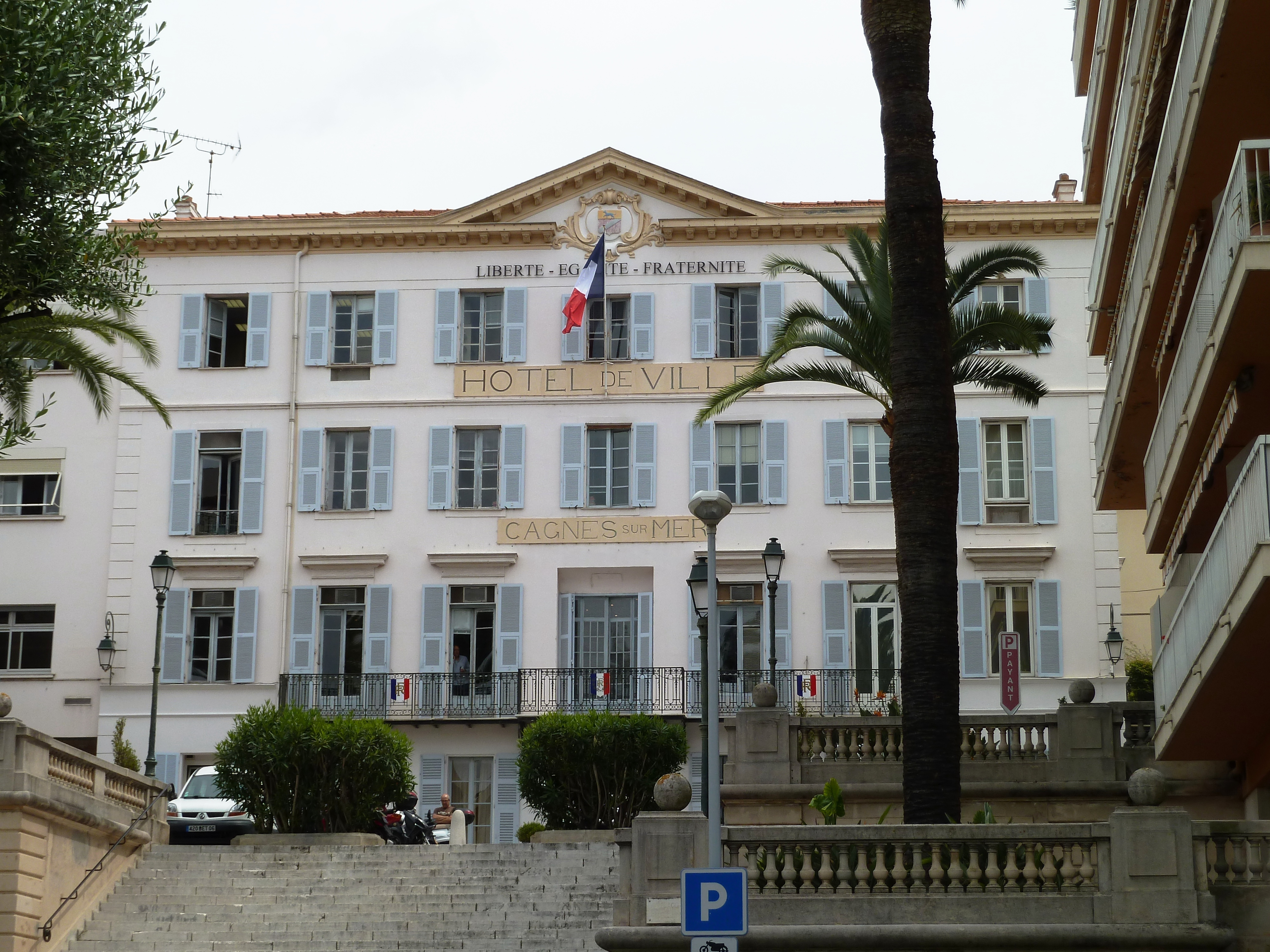
- The main frontage of the Hôtel de Ville in June 2013
- Interactive map of the Hôtel de Ville area

General information
- Type: City hall
- Architectural style: Neoclassical style
- Location: Cagnes-sur-Mer, France
- Coordinates: 43.6637°N 7.1488°E
- Completed: c.1908

The Hôtel de Ville (French pronunciation: [otɛl də vil], City Hall) is a municipal building in Cagnes-sur-Mer, Alpes-Maritimes, in southeast France, standing on Avenue de l'Hôtel de Ville.

== History ==
The medieval part of the town, known as Haut-de-Cagnes, was established at the top of a hill, when the Château Grimaldi was erected there under instruction from Rainier Grimaldi in 1309. Over the next five centuries the town developed round the château. After the French Revolution, the town council chose as their meeting place an old half-timbered building on Rue Saint-Roch, which they referred to as the "maison commune". A plaque celebrating the life of a Greek-born slave, Livius Herma, who freed an entire family of slaves during the time that the area was ruled by Ancient Rome, was attached to the wall of the building.

After finding the first town hall too cramped, the town council decided to buy a second town hall. The building they selected was the old Maison Maurel, which they acquired in 1860, for use as a combined town hall and school.

A coastal village, known as Cros-de-Cagnes, had been developed by fishermen, who came twice a year from Menton, in the late 18th century. A commercial centre, known as Les Logis, which connected the earlier developments, was established in the 19th century. The town council encouraged the development of this area and decided to establish a third town hall, as well as a school and a train station there.

The new town hall was designed in the neoclassical style, built in brick with a stucco finish and was probably completed around 1908. (Note: L'école du Logis (the school), which formed part of the same site and was built parallel to the town hall, was completed in 1908.) The design involved a symmetrical main frontage of seven bays facing onto what is now Avenue de l'Hôtel de Ville. The central bay contained a round headed opening flanked by pilasters supporting lanterns. On the first floor, there was a French door and a wide balcony with iron railings across the central five bays. The other bays on the ground floor and the first floor, and all the bays on the second and third floors were fenestrated by casement windows with shutters. At roof level, there was a modillioned cornice and a pediment across the central three bays, with a coat of arms in the tympanum. Internally, the principal room was the Salle du Conseil (council chamber). During the second half of the 20th century, a modern extension was built to the left of the main structure.
