= Château du Grand-Saint-Jean =

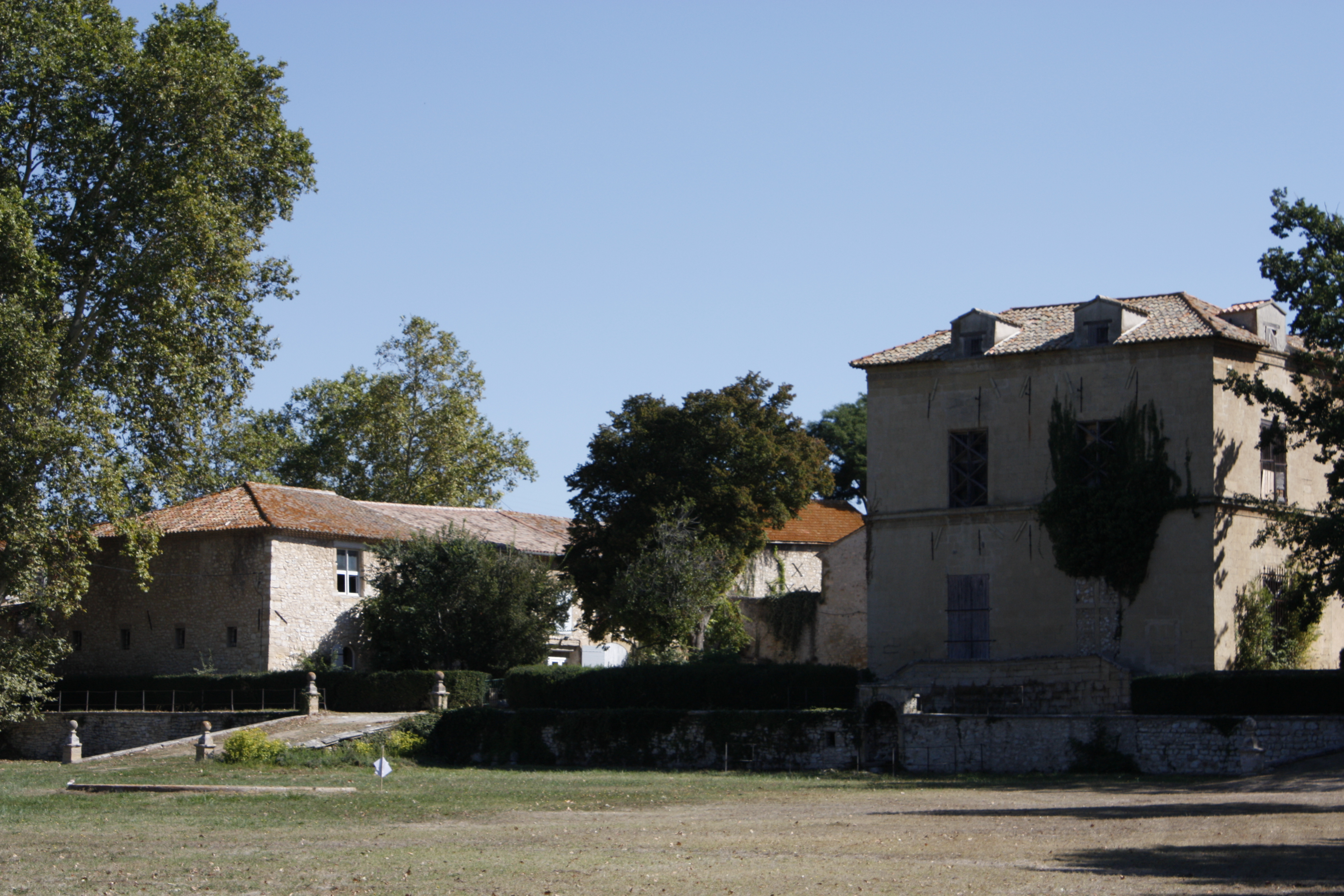
- Interactive map of the Château du Grand-Saint-Jean area

General information
- Type: Chateau
- Location: Puyricard, France
- Coordinates: 43.6028°N 5.3721°E
- Completed: 1591

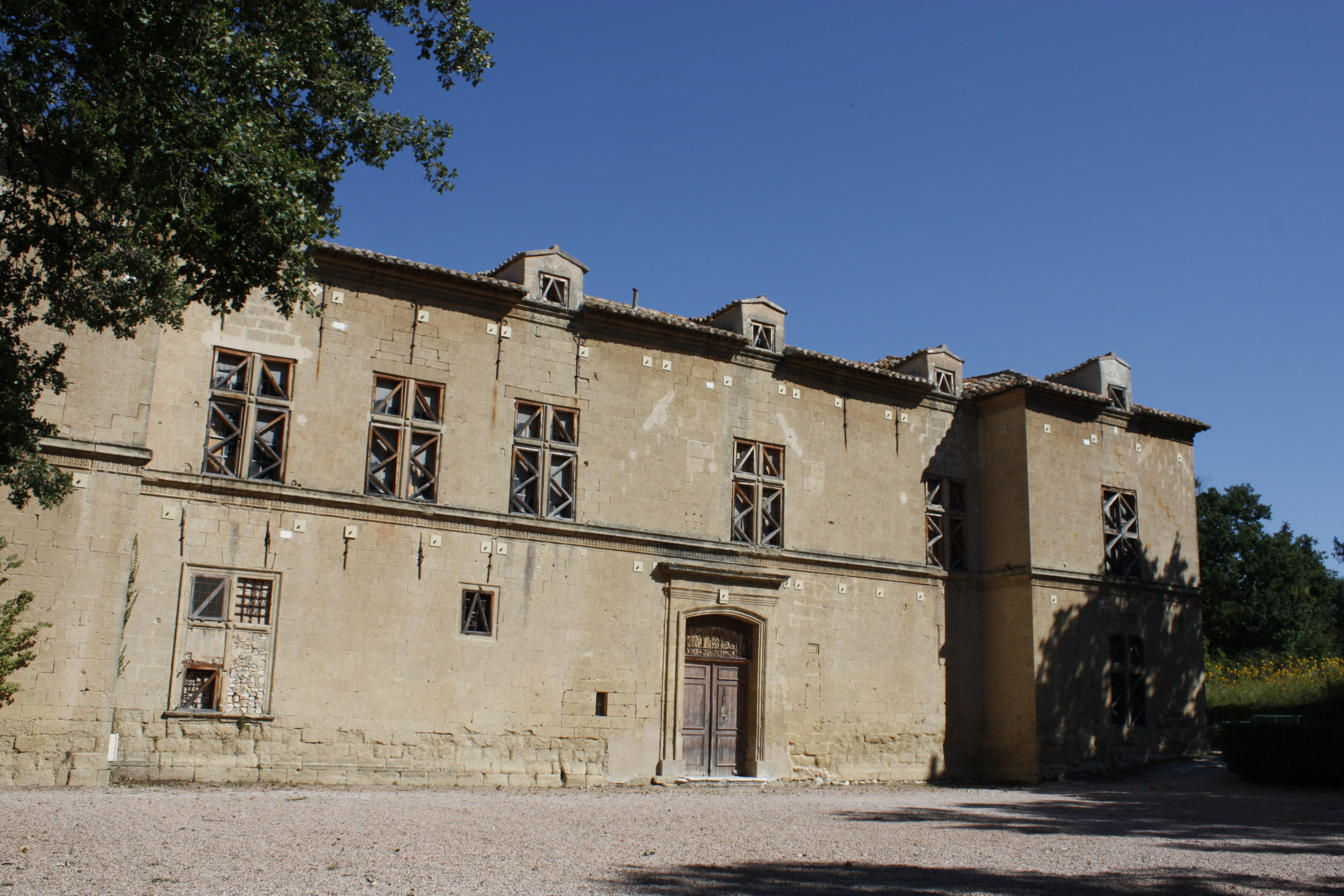
Main facade of the chateau

The Château du Grand-Saint-Jean is a listed chateau in Puyricard, Bouches-du-Rhône, France.

== Location ==
It is located in Puyricard, a former village now part of the city of Aix-en-Provence, in Provence. It is located 30 kilometers away from the centre of Aix. It can be accessed via the Chemin du Grand-Saint-Jean.

== History ==
The construction of the first chateau and the chapel began in the eleventh century. In 1564, King Charles IX of France (1550–1574), Catherine de' Medici (1519–1589), and Henry IV of France (1553–1610) visited the chateau.

The current chateau was built from 1583 to 1591 by Antoine Laurens and Esprit Boyer. In 1622, King Louis XIII (1601–1643) visited the chateau. Four decades later, in 1660, King Louis XIV (1638–1715) was also a guest.

In 1933, Blanche d'Estienne de Saint-Jean, the heiress to the estate, donated the chateau and its grounds to the city of Aix-en-Provence.

Since the 1990s, an outdoors theatre has been one of the venues of the Aix-en-Provence Festival. In 2013, Portuguese composer Vasco Mendonça created an opera based at the Château du Grand-Saint-Jean. It is called, The House Taken Over.

== Heritage significance ==
It has been listed as a "monument historique" since November 3, 1975.
