= Jean-Baptiste de Brancas =

French clergyman

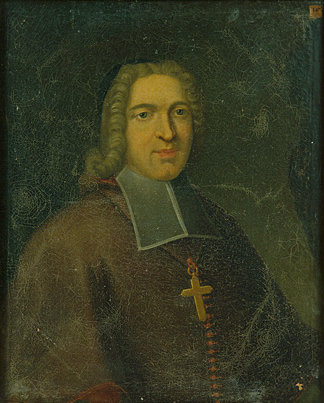
Portrait of Jean-Baptiste de Brancas

Jean-Baptiste de Brancas (1693, Pernes-les-Fontaines—1770, Aix-en-Provence) was a French clergyman. He was Bishop of La Rochelle from 1725 to 1729, then Archbishop of Aix-en-Provence from 1729 until his death in 1770.
