= Girolamo Grimaldi-Cavalleroni =

Italian cardinal

His Eminence Girolamo Grimaldi-Cavalleroni
- Cardinal bishop of Albano; Archbishop of Aix
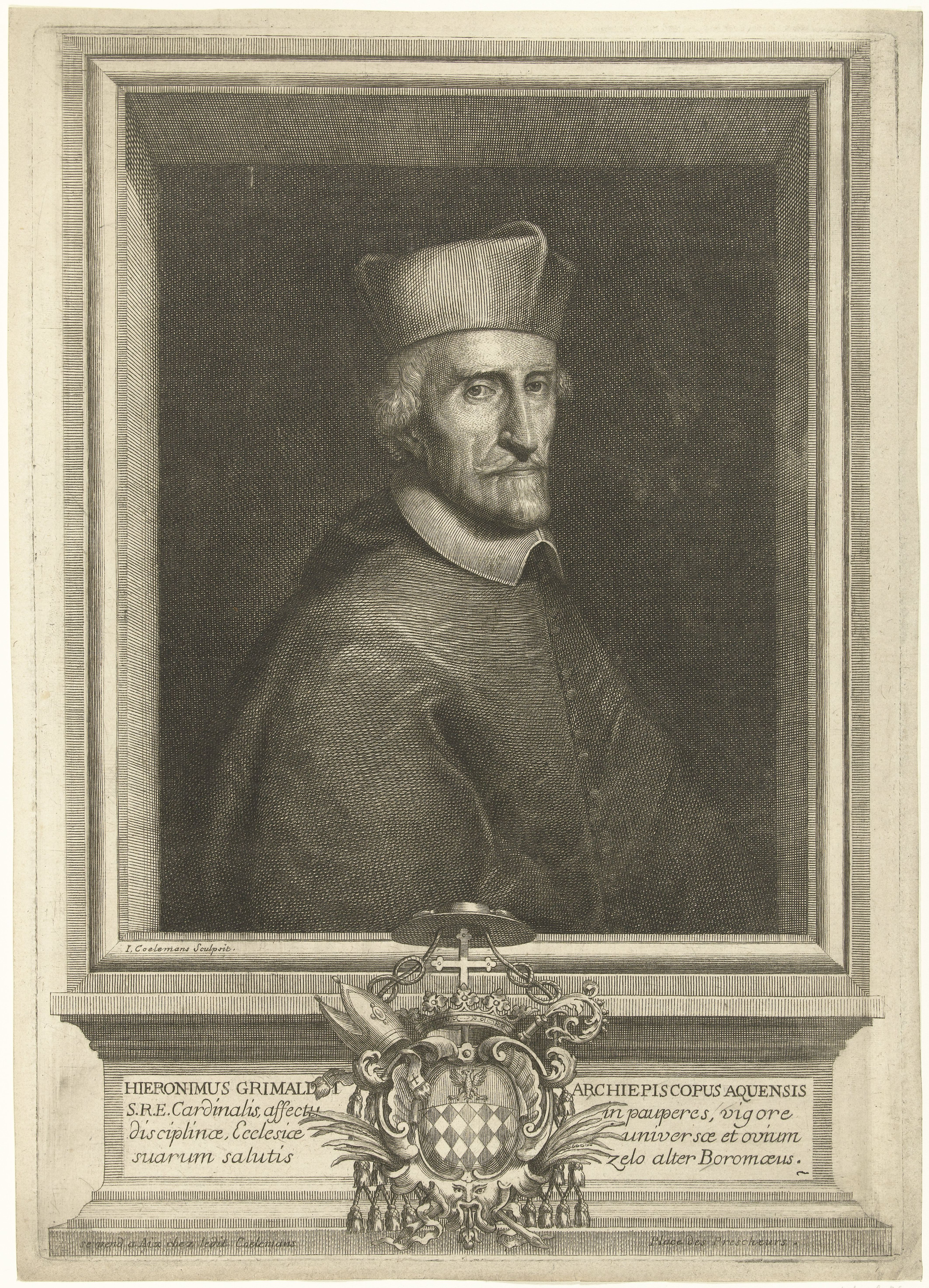
- See: Archdiocese of Aix
- Installed: September 20, 1648—November 4, 1685
- Predecessor: Michel Mazarin, O.P.
- Successor: Charles-Gaspard-Guillaume de Vintimille du Luc
- Other posts: Previously Apostolic Nuncio to France; Titular Archbishop of Seleucia in Isauria

Orders
- Created cardinal: August 17, 1611

Personal details
- Born: August 20, 1597 Genoa, Italy
- Died: November 4, 1685 (aged 88) Aix, France

Girolamo Grimaldi-Cavalleroni (20 August 1597– 4 November 1685) was an Italian cardinal of the Catholic Church and Archbishop of Aix.

== Early life ==
Grimaldi was born in Genoa, the son of Giacomo Grimaldi, a senator of the Republic of Genoa, and his wife Girolama di Agostino de' Mari. As a young man, he enlisted as a soldier and fought for the Holy Roman Empire in Germany during the Thirty Years' War.

== Ecclesiastic career ==
Thereafter, he went to Rome to be educated and entered the Church probably under the patronage of his uncle Domenico Grimaldi, Archbishop of Avignon. In 1621, he was appointed Vice-legate of Viterbo and in 1626, on the death of Cardinal Odoardo Farnese, he became governor of the province.

He returned to Rome and Pope Urban VIII appointed him Governor of Rome from 26 April 1628 until March 1632. According to contemporary, John Bargrave, he conducted himself well as governor and was very popular with the people of Rome. He then became Papal Nuncio extraordinary to the court of Ferdinand II of Austria.

In 1634, he was appointed governor of the city of Perugia, and then governor of the duchy of Urbino.

Aged 43, in 1641, he was appointed Titular Archbishop of Seleucia in Isauria. That same year, he was appointed Apostolic Nuncio to France.

== Cardinalate ==
In 1643, he was elevated to cardinal by Pope Urban VIII and when Urban died the following year, Grimaldi participated in the papal conclave of 1644 that elected Pope Innocent X.

In 1648, he was named Archbishop of Aix, a position he held until his death.

His political scheming to achieve his meteoric rise has led to him being referred to as an alter ego of Cardinal Mazarin. Ironically, while never achieving the political power and fame of Mazarin, Grimaldi had been Mazarin's principal consecrator.

There is no doubt that he was very much a part of the French faction of the College of Cardinals - he was named co-protector of France in Rome by the King of France (to fill-in while Antonio Barberini was temporarily absent), spoke highly of the Barberini during their exile (much to the chagrin of Pope Innocent who refused him audiences as a result) and his extended family were considered to be under the protection of the Kingdom of France. Grimaldi is considered today to have been a strong protector of the interests of France, and to have dealt well the running of the archdiocese. In the summer of 1649 he dealt strongly with an insurrection between two groups of monks, having the protesters driven from the monasteries without waiting for the permission of the Pope to arrive from Rome.

Grimaldi was also a patron of the writer Jean Cabassut the French theologian and priest who accompanied him to Rome, and it was Grimaldi who encouraged Cabassut to enlarge his work "Notitia Conciliorum" and publish it under the title "Notitia ecclesiastica historiarum, conciliorum et canonum invicem collatorum" in 1680.

During his incumbency of the archbishopric over a twenty-year period, he built an episcopal palace at vast expense in the town of Puyricard, which is today known as the Château Grimaldi.

Cardinal Grimaldi-Cavalleroni died in Aix at age of 88. He is buried in the metropolitan cathedral of Aix.

Records
Preceded by Francesco Albizzi	Oldest living Member of the Sacred College; 5 October 1684 - 4 November 1685	Succeeded by Giacomo Franzoni
