= Cagnes-sur-Mer =

Commune in Provence-Alpes-Côte d'Azur, France

- Commune
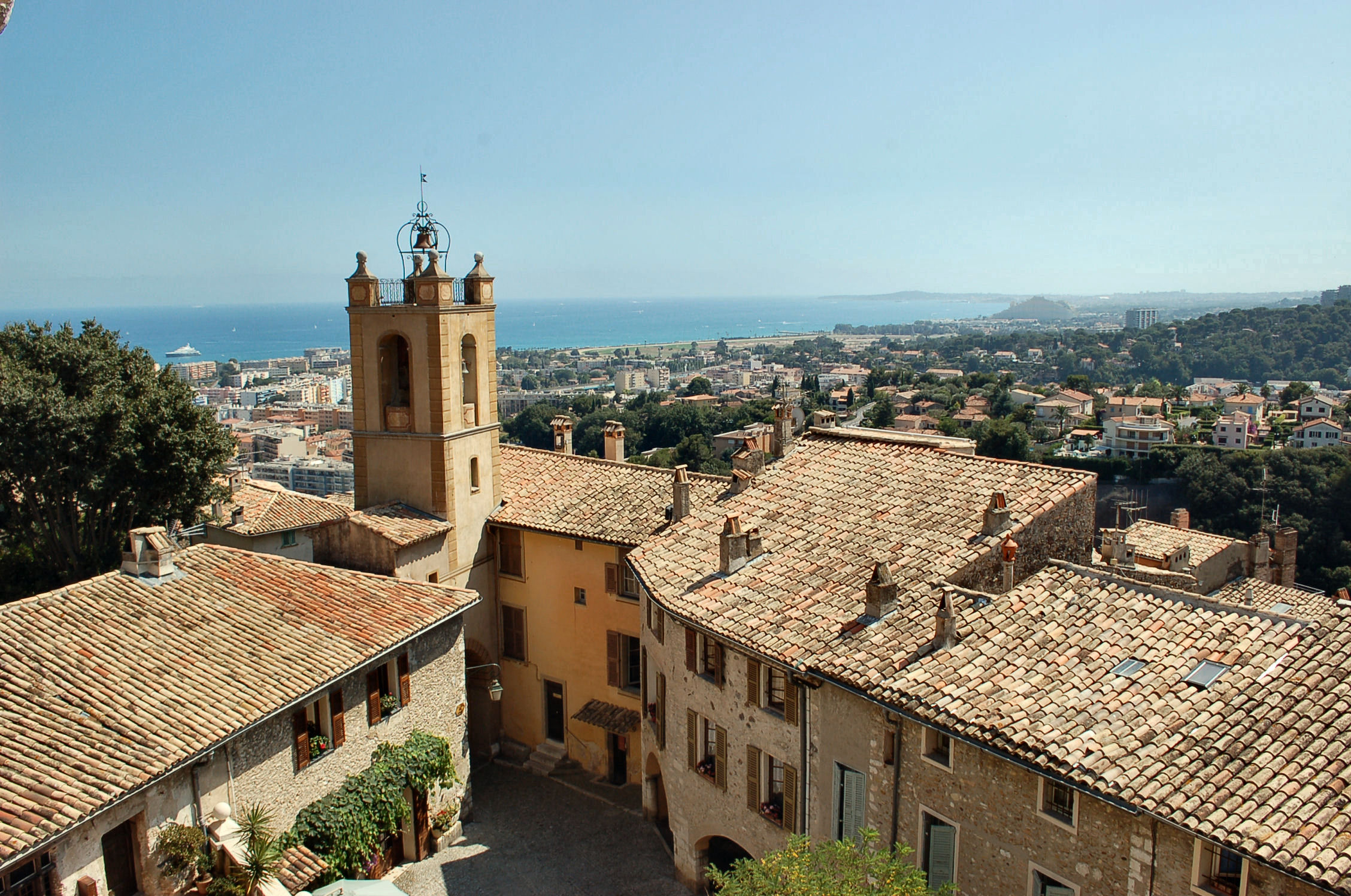
- The old village of Haut-de-Cagnes as seen from the château

- Flag Coat of arms
- Location of Cagnes-sur-Mer
- Location within France Location within Provence-Alpes-Côte d'Azur
- Coordinates: 43°39′52″N 7°08′56″E
- Country: France
- Region: Provence-Alpes-Côte d'Azur
- Department: Alpes-Maritimes
- Arrondissement: Grasse
- Canton: Cagnes-sur-Mer-1 and 2
- Intercommunality: Métropole Nice Côte d'Azur

Government
  - Mayor (2026–32): Bryan Masson
- Area^{1}: 17.95 km^{2} (6.93 sq mi)
- Highest elevation: 187 m (614 ft)
- Lowest elevation: 0 m (0 ft)
- Population (2023): 53,354
  - Density: 2,972/km^{2} (7,698/sq mi)
- Time zone: UTC+01:00 (CET)
  - Summer (DST): UTC+02:00 (CEST)
- INSEE/Postal code: 06027 /06800
- ^{1} French Land Register data, which excludes lakes, ponds, glaciers > 1 km^{2} (0.386 sq mi or 247 acres) and river estuaries.

Cagnes-sur-Mer (French pronunciation: [kaɲ syʁ mɛʁ], literally Cagnes on Sea; Occitan: Canha de Mar) is a French Riviera commune near Nice in the Alpes-Maritimes department, in the Provence-Alpes-Côte d'Azur region, in southeastern France. It is part of the Métropole Nice Côte d'Azur. Its inhabitants are known as Cagnois.

== Geography ==
Cagnes-sur-Mer is a commune in southeastern France on the shores of the Mediterranean Sea between Saint-Laurent-du-Var and Villeneuve-Loubet. The largest suburb of Nice, it stretches along a cove offering nearly 4 kilometres (2.5 mi) of beach and is surrounded by hills, including that of the castle, which rises to 91 metres (299 ft) above sea level.

The municipality covers an area of 1,795 hectares; the elevation ranges from 0 to 187 meters. It is classified as seismic zone 4 (moderate seismicity) and some earthquakes are felt in Cagnes-sur-Mer.

=== Hydrography ===
A coastal river and its main tributary run through the town: the Cagne and the Malvan. The Loup river also borders the commune and, in some places, forms the boundary with the commune of Villeneuve-Loubet.

Cagnes-sur-Mer has a wastewater treatment plant with a capacity of 130,000 PE.

=== Climate ===
In 2010, the municipality’s climate was classified as Mediterranean climate, according to a study by the National Center for Scientific Research based on a method combining climate data and environmental factors (topography, land use, etc.) and data covering the period 1971–2000. In 2020, the climate was classified as Csa (a temperate climate with hot, dry summers), according to the Köppen-Geiger classification for the period 1988–2017. Also in 2020, Météo-France published a new climate typology for metropolitan France which classified the commune within the Mediterranean climate as part of the climatic region Var, Alpes-Maritimes, which is characterized by heavy rainfall in autumn and winter (250-300mm in autumn), abundant sunshine in summer (>75% solar insolation), a mild winter (8°C), and little fog.

For the period 1971–2000, the average annual temperature was 15.8°C, with an annual temperature range of 0°C. The average annual precipitation was 834 mm, with 6.5 days of precipitation in January and 2.1 days in July. For the period 1991–2020, the average annual temperature recorded at the nearest Météo-France weather station, located in the town of Antibes 9km away as the crow flies, is 15.9°C, and the average annual precipitation is 879.5 mm. The highest temperature recorded at this station is 38.5 °C, reached on July 17, 2003; the lowest temperature is −4.4 °C, reached on March 1, 2005 (based on data collected between July 1, 1988 and October 2, 2025).

== History ==
The Château Grimaldi was established by Rainier Grimaldi at the top of a hill in the area now known as "Haut-de-Cagnes" in 1309. A quite separate coastal area, known as "Cros-de-Cagnes", was developed by fishermen, who came twice a year from Menton, in the late 18th century.

The Hôtel de Ville was established in the "Les Logis" area, which developed in the 19th century.

The town was the retreat and final address of the Impressionist painter Pierre-Auguste Renoir, who moved there in 1907 in an attempt to improve his arthritis and remained there until his death in 1919 (Musée Renoir was opened in his house). In the late 1920s, Cagnes-sur-Mer became a residence for many American renowned literary and art figures, such as Katie Boyle, George Antheil, and Harry and Caresse Crosby. The Belgian author Georges Simenon (1903–1989), creator of the fictional detective Commissaire Jules Maigret, lived at 98 montée de la Bourgade in the 1950s with his third wife and their three children; his initial "S" may still be seen in the wrought iron on the stairs.

The Parisian artist, poet, and philosopher Georges Charaire had a home in Cagnes for many years. Creating his lithographs in the former studio of Paul Gauguin and also as a co-founder of the théâtre du Tertre in Montmartre, Charaire had a great influence on French art and thought in the 20th century and helped his friend Eugène Ionesco with his first plays at the théâtre du Tertre. Charaire kept his second home in Cagnes-sur-Mer until his death in 2001.

The Belarusian-French artist Chaïm Soutine created powerful and fanciful landscapes of southern France. A friend of Amedeo Modigliani, Soutine left colourful landscapes from Cagnes starting in 1924. The Spanish Fauvist painter Francisco Iturrino also lived in the town, where he died. The town may have been an inspiration for Henri-Edmond Cross (1856–1910), the Neo-Impressionist artist who painted Cypresses at Cagnes (1908).

== Population ==
Historical population

Year	Pop.	±% p.a.
1793	1,304	—
1800	1,168	−1.56%
1806	1,519	+4.48%
1821	1,936	+1.63%
1831	2,349	+1.95%
1836	2,317	−0.27%
1841	2,102	−1.93%
1846	2,454	+3.15%
1851	2,443	−0.09%
1856	2,280	−1.37%
1861	2,435	+1.32%
1866	2,793	+2.78%
1872	2,582	−1.30%
1876	2,400	−1.81%
1881	2,855	+3.53%
1886	3,057	+1.38%
1891	2,962	−0.63%
1896	3,029	+0.45%
1901	3,381	+2.22%

Year	Pop.	±% p.a.
1906	3,705	+1.85%
1911	5,044	+6.36%
1921	5,395	+0.67%
1926	7,499	+6.81%
1931	7,866	+0.96%
1936	9,038	+2.82%
1946	9,315	+0.30%
1954	11,066	+2.18%
1962	15,392	+4.21%
1968	22,110	+6.22%
1975	29,538	+4.22%
1982	35,214	+2.54%
1990	40,902	+1.89%
1999	43,942	+0.80%
2007	48,941	+1.36%
2012	46,686	−0.94%
2017	50,928	+1.75%
2023	53,354	+0.78%

Source: EHESS and INSEE (1968–2023)

== Sights ==
Places of interest include Renoir's estate, Les Collettes, surrounded by olive trees; the medieval castle at le Haut-de-Cagnes; and the Cros area, which was founded by Italian fishermen in the 19th century.

The town is also known for its horse-racing venue, the Hippodrome de la Côte d'Azur, as well as for its 4 km (2 mi) beach.

== Transport ==
The Gare de Cagnes-sur-Mer is a railway station that offers local services to Nice and Cannes.

== International relations ==
in 1973, the commune twinned with Passau in Germany.

== Photo gallery ==
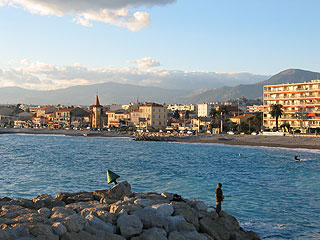
Cros-de-Cagnes

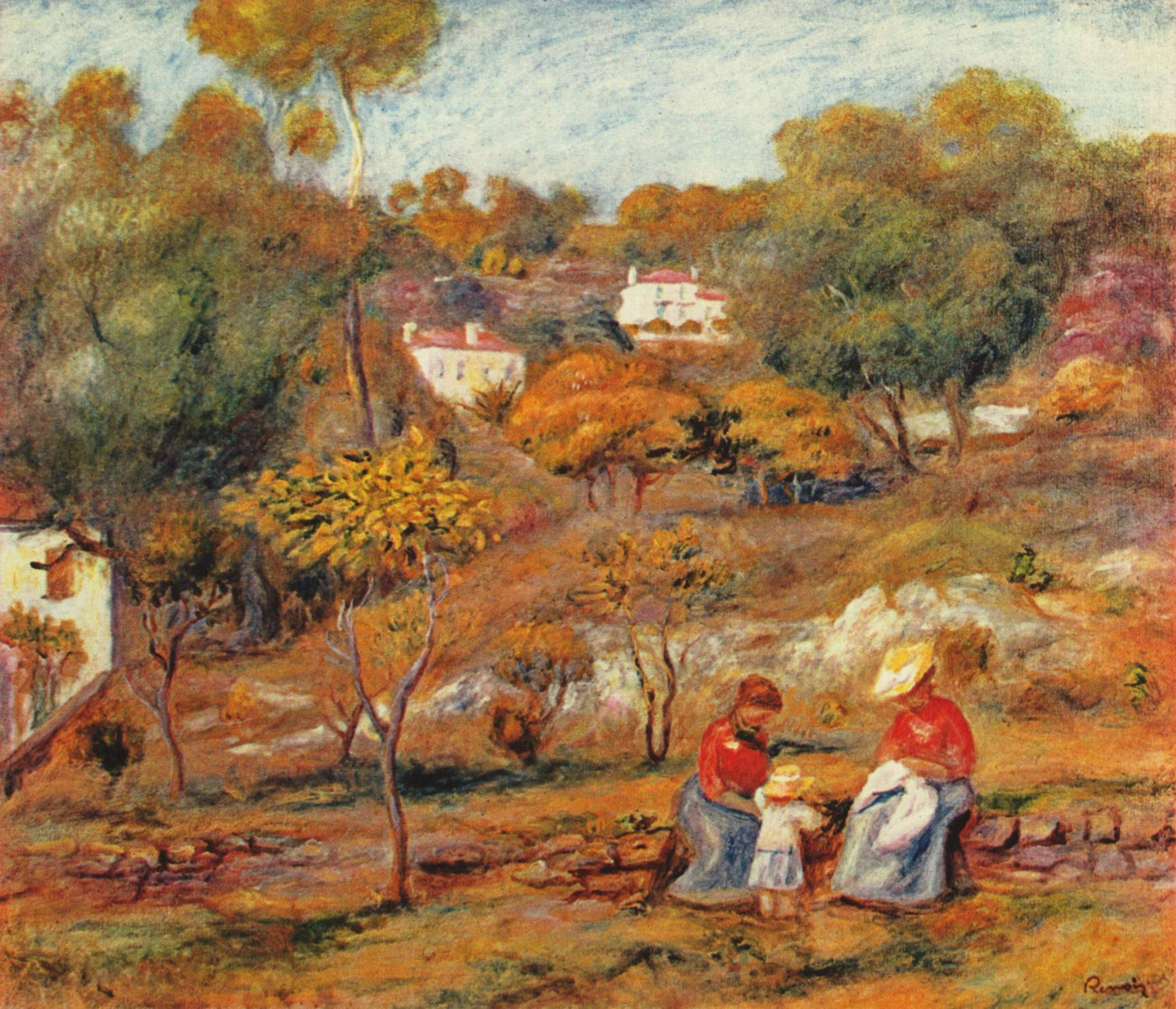
Landscape near Cagnes, by Pierre-Auguste Renoir

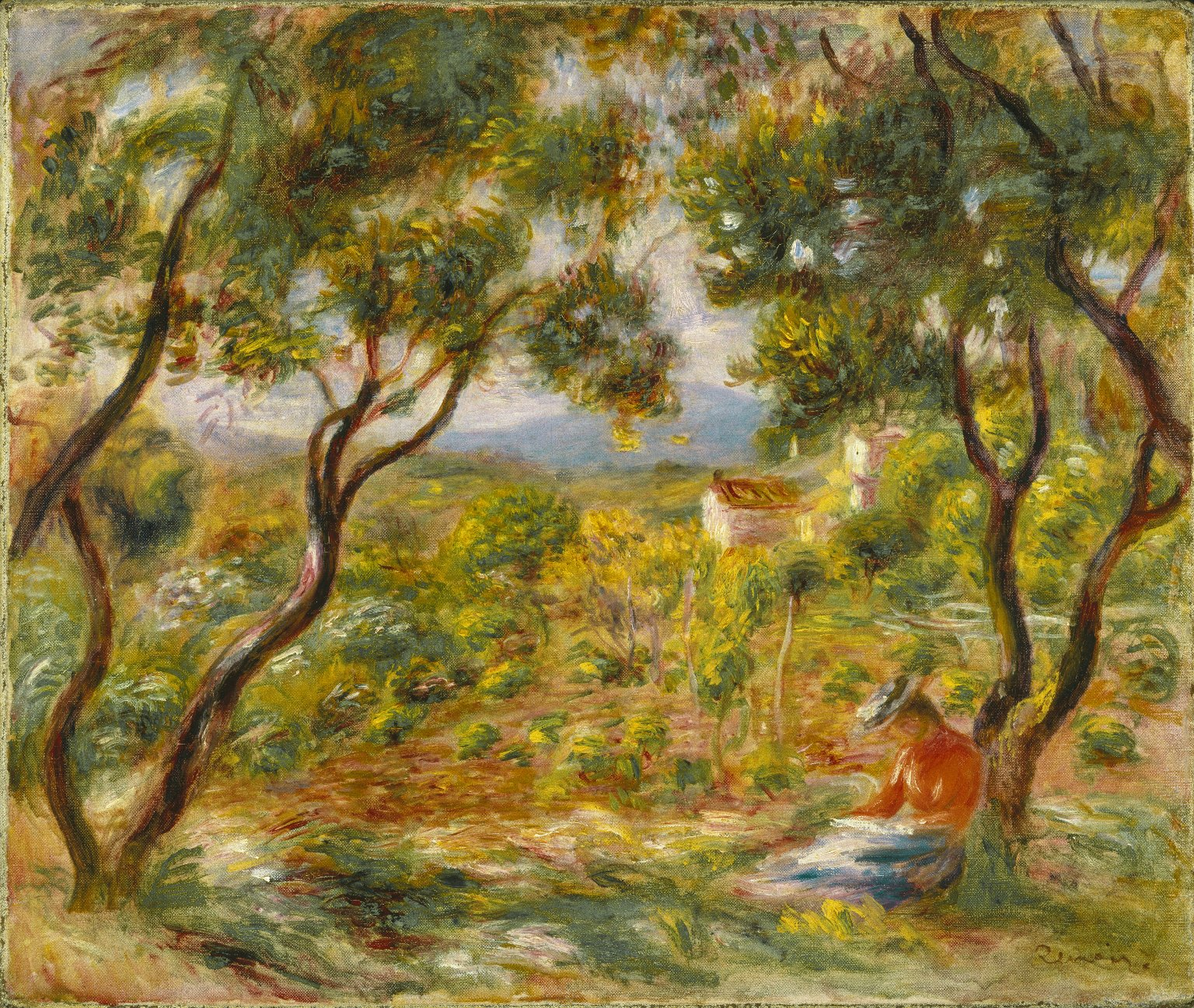
The Vineyards at Cagnes by Pierre-Auguste Renoir, 1908. Brooklyn Museum

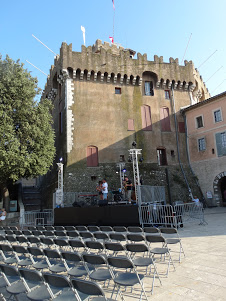
The Grimaldi castle museum in Haut-de-Cagnes

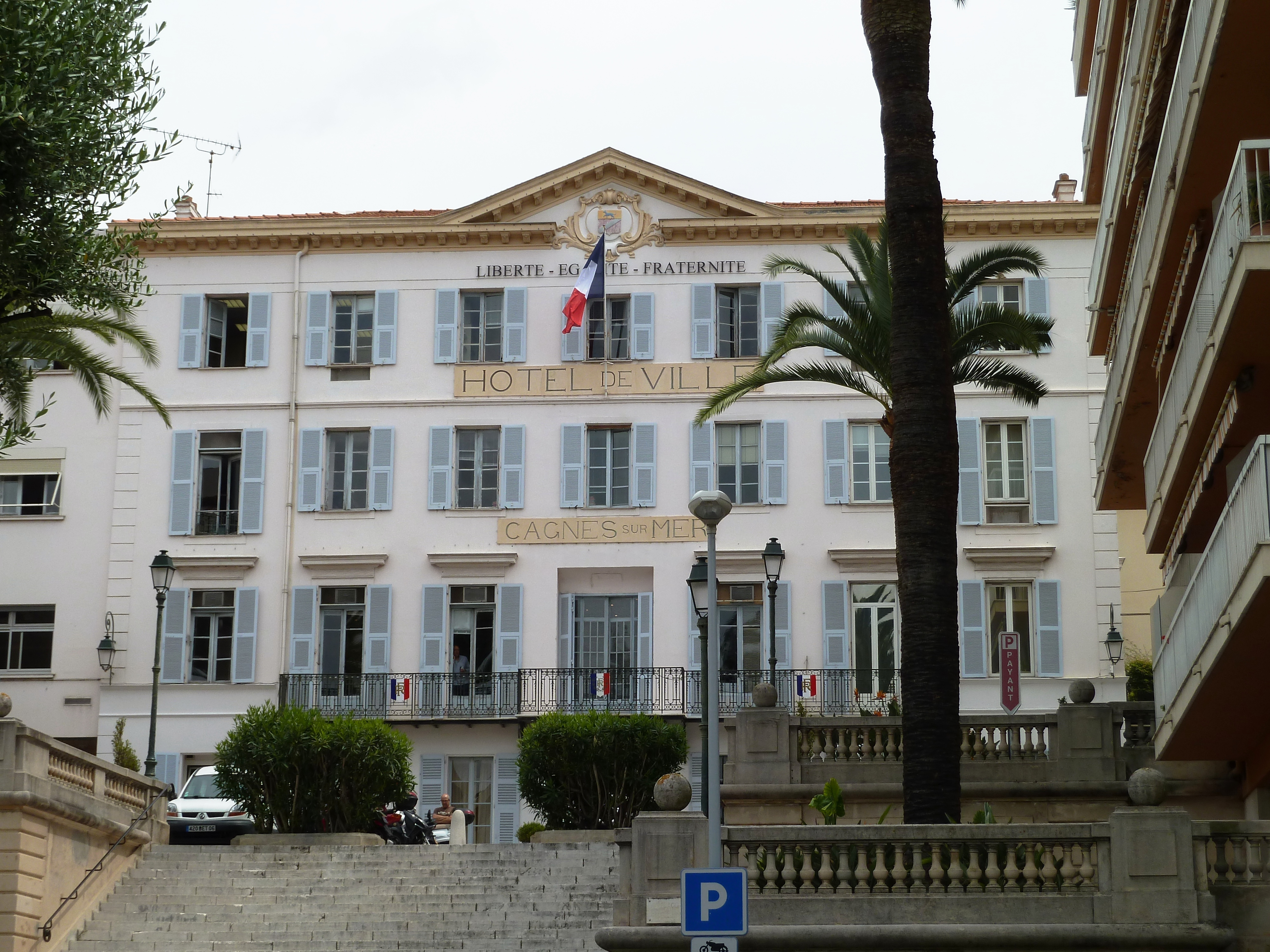
The Hôtel de Ville

== See also ==
- Communes of the Alpes-Maritimes department
