= Menelphalus =

Gallo-Roman archbishop

Saint Menelphalus of Aix
- Died: c.430 AD; Aix-en-Provence
- Venerated in: Roman Catholic Church; Eastern Orthodox Church
- Canonized: Pre-Congregational Saint
- Major shrine: Aix-en-Provence,
- Feast: 22 April
- Patronage: Aix-en-Provence
- Controversy: Few contemporary sources, sainthood restricted to Aix area, little known about him

Menelphalus (or Menelphale) was a 5th-century metropolitan archbishop of Aix. He seems to have followed Maximus or Maxime, who served in 419 when Pope Boniface ordered him and other bishops to investigate another Maximus, the bishop of Valence, for the charges of Manichean heresy. This means Menelphalus likely served as bishop in the 420s, and he is given the floruit of 420 or 425. Duchene questioned the 5th-century date entirely as an arbitrary decision as the only reference he could find to the saint was from the 9th-10 centuries, however the necropolis from which Menelphalus was moved appears to be from Late Antiquity, and the see of Aix was only established or restored in the 5th century, so Menelphalus is likely to have served between the death of Maximus and the accession of Basilius. It should also be noted that St. Basilius constructed the Cathedral of Aix around 500AD and future archbishops were buried there, whereas Menelphalus was buried in the Old Chapel of St. Lawrence. Additionally, Armentarius is an uncommon name, so for it to appear in Menelphalus' reliquary plaque as well being the name of a 5th-century chorbishop of the nearby Embrun led some to believe that St. Armentarius of Embrun was Menelphalus' successor, given that Menelphalus' name appears to have precedence over him. On the other hand, Joseph Hyacinthe Albanés felt certain that the venerated saint Menelphalus would not have been involved in the illegal consecration of Armentarius over Embrun, which caused much controversy at the time, making Albanés date Menelphalus towards the end of the 5th century.

Menelphalus is credited with guiding the people of Aix and being "a great consolation to his flocks" during the tumultuous period when the Visigoths under Theodoric I, who were considered to be heretics, were frequently besieging cities of Gallia Narbonensis and Gallia Viennensis. He was said to have led an exemplary life, and at a time when Roman and ecclesial power waned, this gave him the ability to govern his people effectively. He was canonised by popular acclaim not long after his death. He was accordingly interred in the "first Christian cemetery of the city of Aix", the Chapel of St. Lawrence, which no longer exists. He was succeeded by St. Armentarius (also called Armentary or Armantaire) around the year 430.

Menelphalus' remains were moved to the main cathedral in the ninth or tenth century, and a plaque was raised to commemorate the fact, saying:

Hic ossa sanctorum Menelfalij

Episcopi, nec non Armentary ab Ecclefia

B. Laurenty tranfuecta pofitafunt.

Transitus Menelphalij x. Kal. May;

Armentary verò nonis Octobris.

Which means: "Here lie the bones of saints Menelphale, the Bishop, and also of Armentary, transferred from the Church of the Blessed Lawrence. The passage of Menelphale occurred on the 10th day before the Kalends of May; Armentary was transferred on the ninth of October."

This is one of the few surviving testaments to his episcopacy, as well as the Chapel of St. Lawrence. He is celebrated on April 22, the anniversary of the transfer of his relics according to the chapel plaque.
