= Château de la Calade =

Coordinates: 43.5728°N 5.3897°E

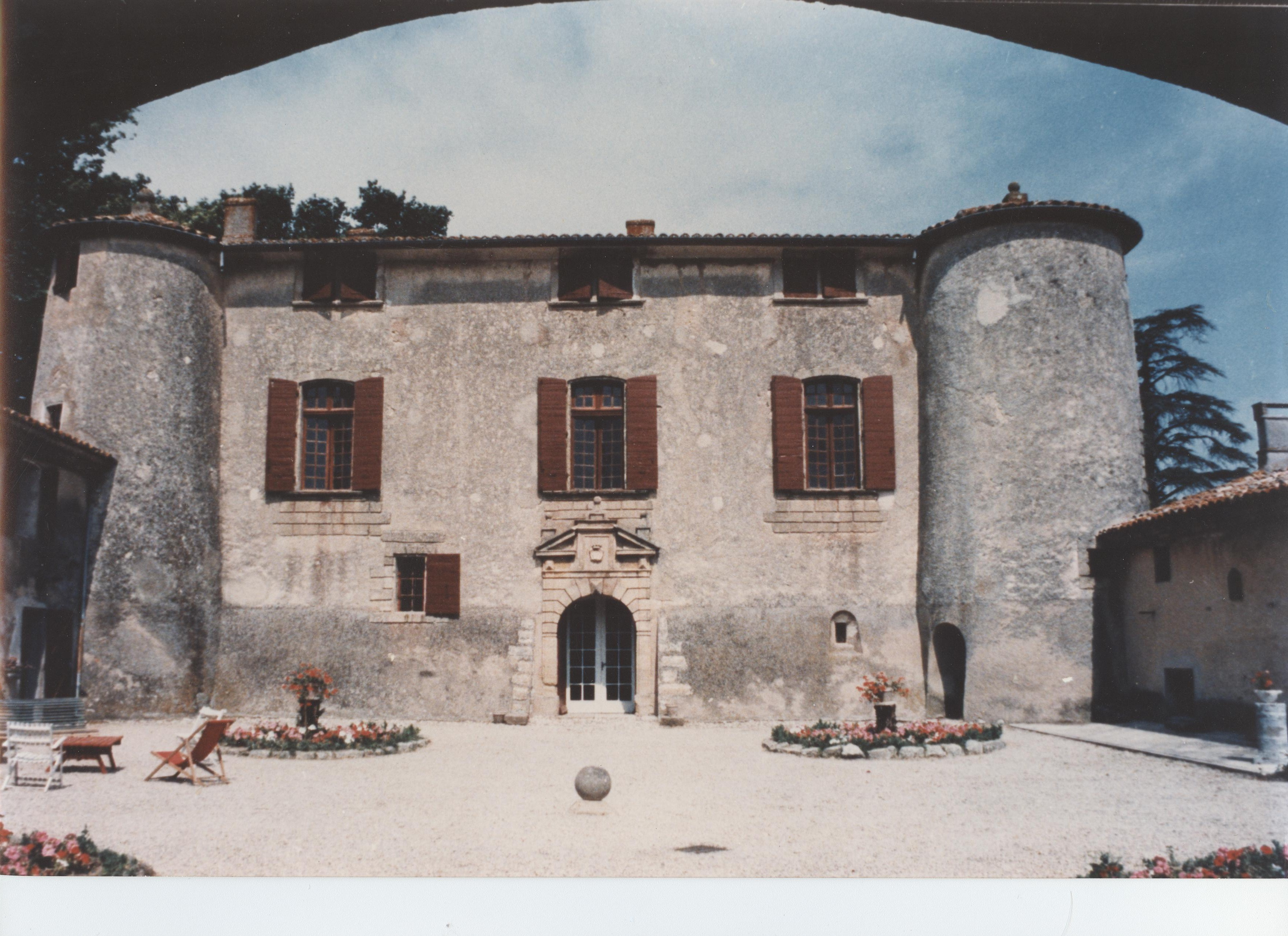
- Interactive map of the Château de la Calade area

General information
- Type: Château
- Location: 1330 chemin du Château-de-la-Calade, Aix-en-Provence, France
- Completed: 1653

The Château de la Calade is a listed château in Aix-en-Provence.

== Location ==
It is located at 1330, chemin du Château-de-la-Calade in Aix-en-Provence, close to Puyricard. It is also not far from the Touloubre river.

== History ==
It was built from 1634 to 1653 for Jérôme de Duranti. The architectural style was archaic on purpose: Jérôme de Duranti had only recently become a member of the aristocracy, and he wanted to look more regal. It only has two stories, with a turret on each side. Inside, the wallpaper named "jardins de Bagatelle" was painted between 1800 and 1804.

== Architectural significance ==
It has been listed as a monument historique since 2011.

== Secondary Source ==
- Jean Boyer, Le château de la Calade (Revue municipale, 1981).
