= Château Grimaldi (Puyricard) =

Castle in France

Coordinates: 43°35′16″N 5°24′52″E

See also Château Grimaldi (disambiguation) for other Châteaux of the same name.

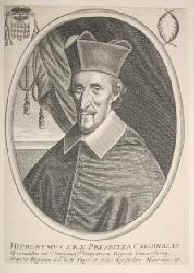
Girolamo Grimaldi-Cavalleroni (1597–1685). Grimaldi transformed the ruined castle at Puyricard into an episcopal palace

Château Grimaldi at Puyricard near Aix-en-Provence is a mansion built within the ruined walls of a 16th-century Château once belonging to the Archbishops of Puyricard. The original castle chapel remains built in the Romanesque style. Between 1655 and 1685 the château served as residence of Cardinal Archbishop Girolamo Grimaldi-Cavalleroni who had rebuilt the chateau which had been in ruins for 70 years. As the residence of an archbishop the ruined Château is sometimes referred to as an episcopal palace. The term "palace" for any residence, no matter how large, other than episcopal is not commonly used in Europe for any rural building.

The earlier chateau had been the ancestral seat of the Princes of Baux, from whom it passed to the Archbishops of Puyricard. During the 17th century the incumbent archbishop Jerome de Grimaldi had the new plans for the restoration drawn up based on the Palazzo Farnese. The principal facade was divided by pilasters between which there were said to be 365 windows. The palace cost 2 million livre to construct from 1657–1678, yet it was to last little more than 50 years. In 1709, the palace was demolished, just a few walls survived the blasts of gunpowder necessary to demolish the thick walls,

The present structure built inside the walls is a later date than the ruined Château and while referred to as a château is in fact little more than a large farm house. The main facade being of seven bays, with an entrance in the center. On three floors, the top floor is low service floor. The building has a low pitched roof of terra cotta pantiles. The roof betrays the "château's" more humble origins. Had the building been constructed as a chateau, the roof would have been concealed, or given highly visible prominence in the French Renaissance style.
