= Château Grimaldi =

Château Grimaldi is the name given to several Châteaux in Europe which were founded by various members of the Grimaldi Family.

These Châteaux include:

- Château Grimaldi (Cagnes), at Cagnes-sur-Mer in the département of Alpes-Maritimes, in France, is built on the site of an earlier fortress occupied by the Greeks and then the Romans
- Château Grimaldi (Antibes) (also known as the Picasso Museum), at Antibes is built upon the foundations of the ancient Greek town of Antipolis. Antibes is a resort town in the Alpes-Maritimes department in southeastern France, on the Mediterranean Sea
- Château Grimaldi (Puyricard), at Puyricard near Aix-en-Provence is a mansion built within the ruined walls of a 16th-century Château once belonging to the Archbishops of Puyricard
- The Prince's Palace of Monaco, sometimes referred to as Château Grimaldi in the Middle Ages
