= Floribeth Mora Diaz =

Costa Rican lawyer (born 1963)

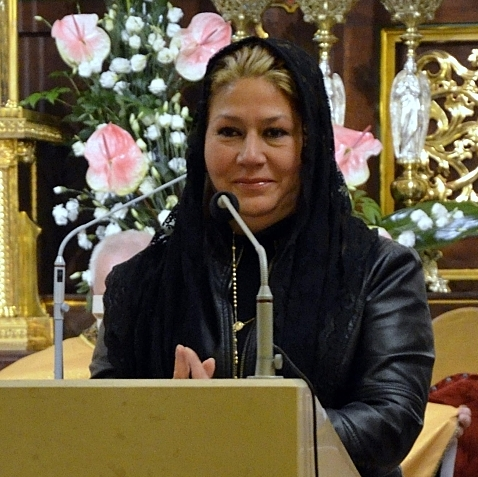
- Floribeth Mora Diaz
- Born: 11 June 1963 (age 63); San José, Costa Rica
- Occupation: Lawyer

Floribeth Mora Diaz (born 19 June 1963) is a Costa Rican lawyer who was reportedly the subject of a miracle when she was cured of brain aneurysm. Her case was used to support the canonisation of Pope John Paul II.

== Life ==
Diaz was born in San José in 1963 and she became a lawyer. She developed a cerebral aneurysm which was diagnosed in April 2011 as inoperable. She was given a month to live. She prayed asking for the intercession of Pope John Paul II. Pope John Paul II had died six years before but Diaz was his admirer. She woke on 1 May and watched the beatification of John Paul II on television. She was later woken by what she said was the voice of John Paul II telling her to get up. She became well and this was declared miraculous by the Catholic Church. Alejandro Vargas Román who was a Catholic neurosurgeon who knew of her case said that the cure was inexplicable. He had discussed this with priests at the Vatican.

This healing was considered the second miracle due to the intercession of the late Pope John Paul II, after the cure of Sr. Marie Simon-Pierre of Parkinson's disease. These miracles fulfilled the conditions necessary for canonization. Blessed John Paul II was thus canonized on April 27, 2014, by Pope Francis. Mora Diaz attended the ceremony.
