= Château Grimaldi (Cagnes) =

Castle in Provence-Alpes-Côte d'Azur, France

Coordinates: 43.6671°N 7.1455°E

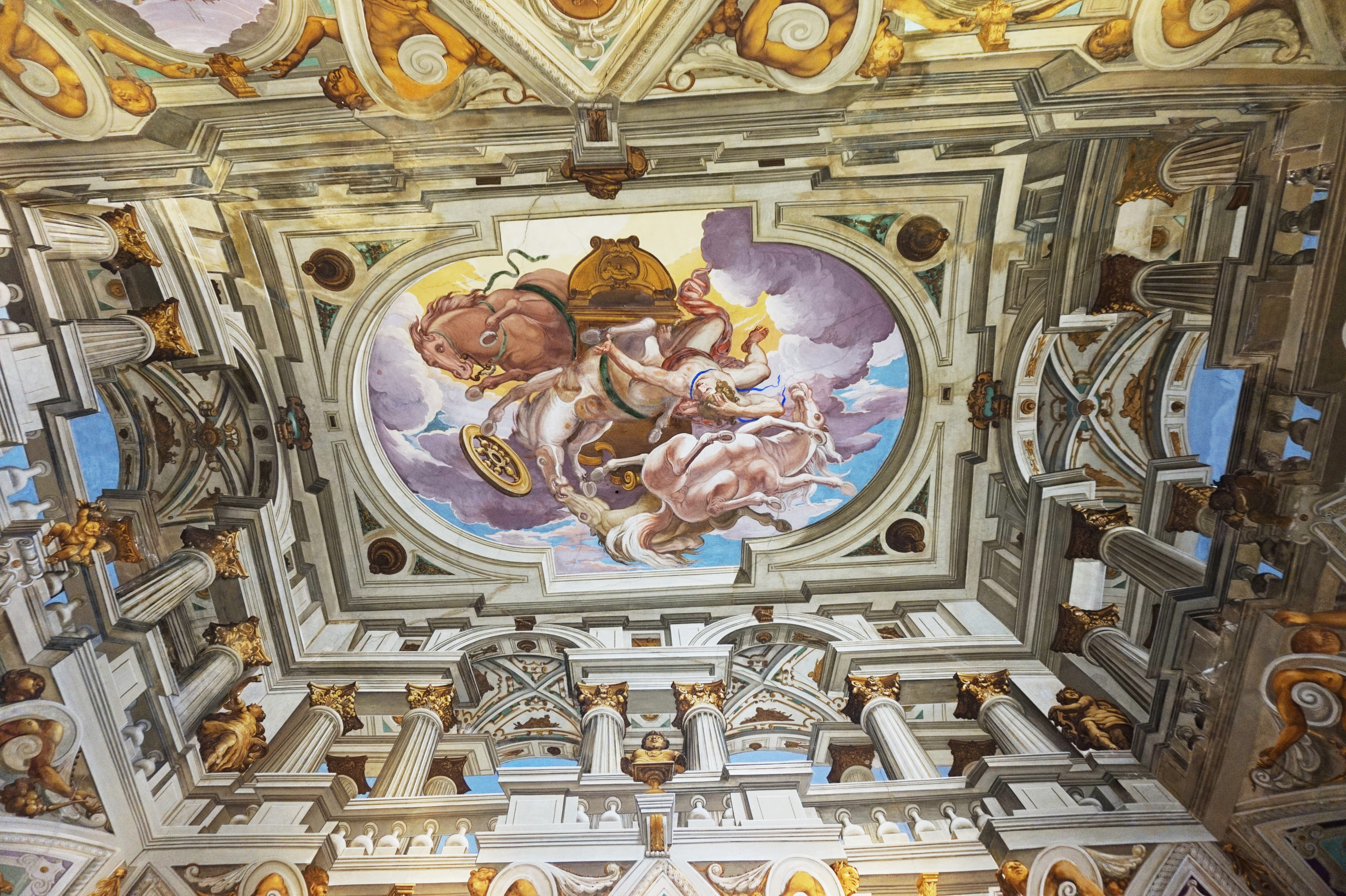
Ceiling of the Château Grimaldi

See also Château Grimaldi (disambiguation) for other Châteaux of the same name

The Château Grimaldi at Cagnes-sur-Mer in the département of Alpes-Maritimes, in France, is built on the site of an earlier fortress occupied by the Greeks and then the Romans. The present castle was built in 1309 by Rainier Grimaldi (Lord of Cagnes and an admiral of France) - a distant ancestor of the present ruling house of Monaco. Later, it became the residence of the Governors of the province. Following the French Revolution, it was used as barracks and later as a hospital. Now owned by the city of Cagnes, it is known as le Château Musée Grimaldi (the Grimaldi Castle and Museum).

Built upon a hilltop, the castle towers over the town. Constructed in the local stone, it retains many of its original medieval features and motifs, it is machicolated with crenelations surmounting its towers and keep. The castle is built around a triangular courtyard. During the reign of Louis XIII (1610 to 1643) the castle was altered, and the principal rooms made more comfortable and redecorated in the contemporary taste. The great hall has a painted ceiling depicting the Fall of Phaëton, completed in the 1620s by the Genovese painter Giulio Benso (though sometimes attributed to Giovanni Battista Carlone), while the chapel has a ceiling painted with folk scenes.

Today, the castle is an exhibition centre for contemporary art from around the world, and a museum of modern art.
