= Puyricard =

Village in France

Coordinates: 43°35′N 5°25′E

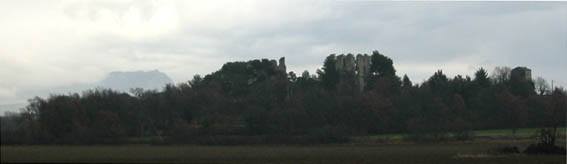
Ruins of the medieval castle at Puyricard

Puyricard (Provençal: Pue-Ricard in MODERN ORTHOGRAPHY) is an agglomeration in the Bouches-du-Rhône département in Provence in the south of France, dependent on the town of Aix-en-Provence, which is approximately 10 km to the southeast. It has developed around the old village of Puyricard, which dates back to medieval times.

== Description ==
In medieval times Puyricard was part of the fiefdom of the Lords of Baux. Ruins of their ancestral castle, remodelled in the seventeenth century as an episcopal palace by the Archbishop of Aix Girolamo Grimaldi-Cavalleroni, are preserved at the present day Chateau Grimaldi. The Romanesque church in the centre of the village dates back to the 11th century and contains an altar from the medieval castle.

The town has given its name to a brand of chocolate, well known in France, manufactured locally since 1968 by the Belgian family Roelandts.

The graduate management school IAE Aix-en-Provence (Institut d'Administration des Entreprises), part of Aix-Marseille University, is located in Puyricard.

== See also ==
- Château de la Calade
