= Archdiocese of Aix =

Catholic archdiocese in France

Coordinates: 43°31′57″N 5°27′05″E

Archdiocese of Aix-en-Provence and Arles Archidioecesis Aquensis in Gallia et Arelatensis: Archidiocèse d'Aix-en-Provence et Arles; Archidiocèsi de z-Ais e Arle; Archidioucèsi de z'Ais e Arle

Catholic
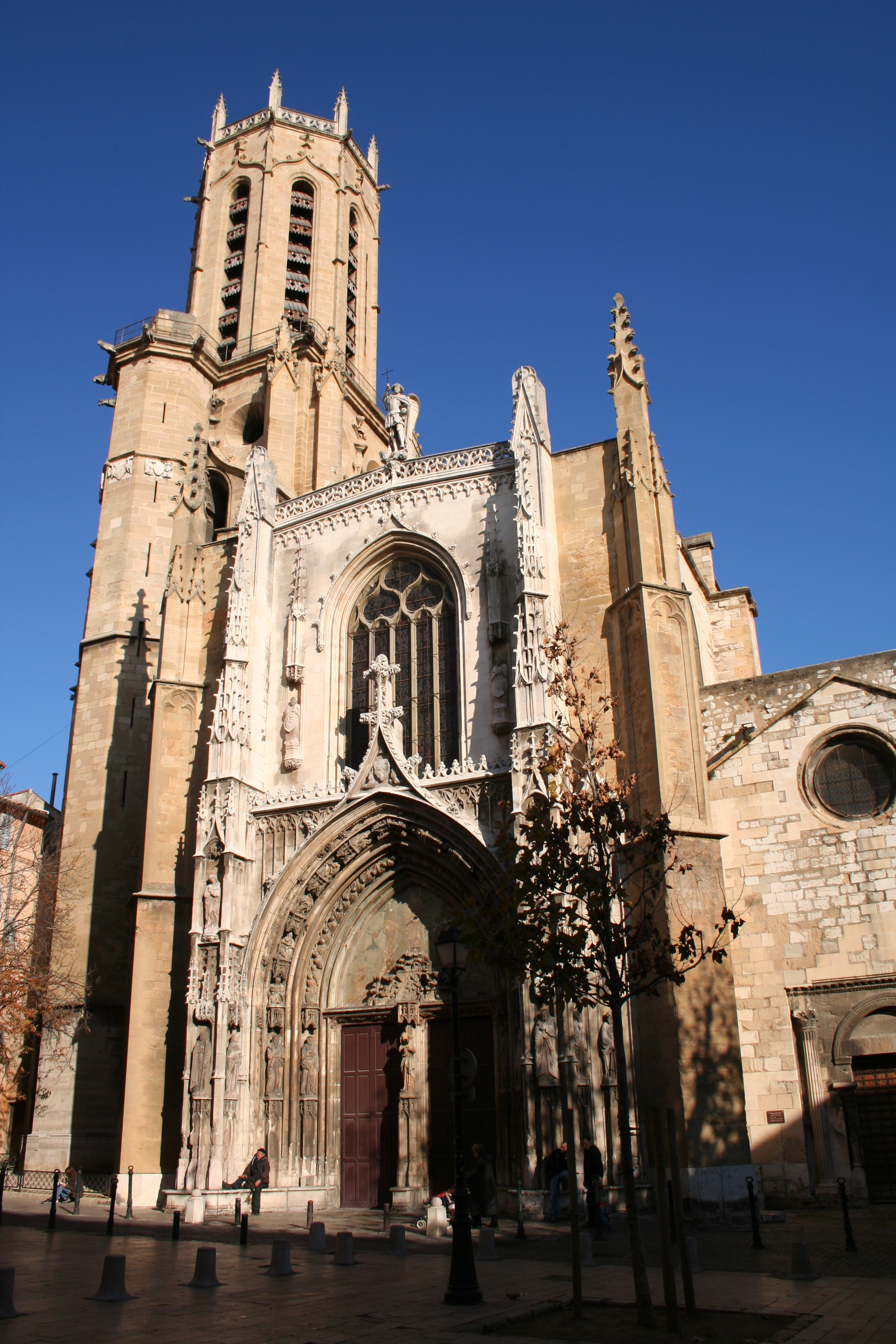
- Aix Cathedral

Location
- Country: France
- Ecclesiastical province: Marseille
- Metropolitan: Archdiocese of Marseille

Statistics
- Area: 4,580 km^{2} (1,770 sq mi)
- Population: Total; Catholics: (as of 2022); 957,291 ▲ (est.); 677,000 ▼ (est.)
- Parishes: 118

Information
- Denomination: Catholic
- Sui iuris church: Latin Church
- Rite: Roman Rite
- Established: by 5th Century
- Cathedral: Aix Cathedral
- Patron saint: Saint Maximinus of Aix
- Secular priests: 113 ▼ (diocesan); 15 ▼ (Religious Orders); 29 ▲ Permanent Deacons

Current leadership
- Pope: Leo XIV
- Archbishop: Christian Delarbre
- Metropolitan Archbishop: Jean-Marc Aveline
- Bishops emeritus: Christophe Dufour

Map

Website
- catho-aixarles.fr

The Archdiocese of Aix-en-Provence and Arles (Latin: Archidioecesis Aquensis in Gallia et Arelatensis; French: Archidiocèse d'Aix-en-Provence et Arles; Occitan Provençal: Archidiocèsi de Ais de Provença e Arle or Archidioucèsi de z'Ais e Arle) is a Latin Church ecclesiastical territory or archdiocese of the Catholic Church in France. The archepiscopal see is located in the city of Aix-en-Provence. The diocese comprises the department of Bouches-du-Rhône (minus the arrondissement of Marseilles), in the Region of Provence-Alpes-Côte d'Azur. It is currently a suffragan of the Archdiocese of Marseilles and consequently the archbishop no longer wears the pallium.

After the Concordat, the archdiocese gained the titles of Arles and Embrun (1822), becoming the Archdiocese of Aix (–Arles–Embrun) (Latin: Archidioecesis Aquensis in Gallia (–Arelatensis–Ebrodunensis); French: Archidiocèse d'Aix (–Arles–Embrun); Occitan Provençal: Archidiocèsi de Ais (–Arle–Ambrun) or Archidioucèsi de z'Ais (–Arle–Ambrun)). The dioceses of Fréjus and Toulon had been suppressed and parts of Toulon and Riez were attributed to Aix. But in the Concordat of 1817, Arles was reestablished as a metropolitanate (which lasted only until 1822, when it became suffragan to Aix), and the metropolitanate of Aix was assigned the suffragan dioceses of Fréjus (including Toulon, where its bishop now resides), Digne, and Gap. From 1838 to 1867 the diocese of Algiers was also suffragan (subordinate) to the archbishop of Aix.

In 2007, the name of the diocese was changed again to the Archdiocese of Aix (–Arles) (Latin: Archidioecesis Aquensis in Gallia (–Arelatensis); French: Archidiocèse d'Aix (–Arles); Occitan Provençal: Archidiocèsi de Ais (–Arle) or Archidioucèsi de z'Ais (–Arle)). In 2008, the title of Embrun was reattached to the Diocese of Gap by decision of Pope Benedict XVI.

The current archbishop is Christian Delarbre.

== History ==
Certain traditions make Saint Maximinus, one of the seventy-two Disciples and the companion of Mary Magdalen in Provence (for which there is no biblical justification), the first bishop of Aix. Louis Duchesne seems to have proved that this saint, the object of a local cult, was not considered the first bishop of Aix, or connected with the life of Saint Mary Magdalen, except in later legends, written towards the middle of the 11th century by the monks of Vézelay and by Bishop Rostan de Fos, who was seeking funds for the building of a cathedral.

=== The Roman Empire ===
The city of Aix became a matter of controversy at the beginning of the fifth century. The Council of Nicaea, in its fourth canon, had decreed that each ecclesiastical province, which was coterminous with the Imperial Roman province, should have as its metropolitan the bishop of the capital city of the province. Aix had been the capital of the Roman Imperial province of Gallia Narbonensis Secunda, one of the seventeen Roman provinces in Gaul. Gallia Narbonensis Secunda included the cities of Aix, Gap, Sisteron, Apt, Riez, Fréjus, Antibes and Nice. By the end of the fourth century, certainly by the time of Theodosius the Great in 381, however, the number of provinces had been reduced to fifteen, and Gallia Narbonensis Secunda had been combined with Gallia Narbonensis Prima. Who, then, was the metropolitan of the ecclesiastical province of Gallia Narbonensis Prima et Secunda? The Council of Turin, which met in September 401 (?), was faced with competing claims, from the metropolitan of Viennensis, the metropolitan of Arles, and Proculus the bishop of Marseille (who had been the delegate of the Gauls at the Council of Aquileia in 381). The decision of the council was that the bishop of Marseille had no claim to the metropolitan status over Gallia secunda, since it was not in his own province. Bishop Proculus could continue to hold the title of metropolitan during his lifetime, but only out of respect for his personal qualities, not as a matter of principle. Thereafter, with regard to the claims of the archbishops of Vienne and Arles, whichever of the two could prove his right to metropolitan status over Gallia secunda should be the metropolitan. There seems to have been no bishop of Aix present, nor even a representative, to speak for the city of Aix or present proof of its status.

The first historically known bishop of Aix, Lazarus, occupied this see about the beginning of the 5th century. He had been ordained by Bishop Proculus of Marseille, which caused a scandal and reproaches from Pope Zosimus, since he had been condemned at the Council of Turin as a calumniator. He was ordained under the reign of the usurper Constantine, and on his fall in 411, Lazarus resigned.

The issue of metropolitan status was settled by Pope Zosimus in a letter of 29 September 417 to the bishops of the province of Vienne and the province of Gallia Narbonensis Secunda, declaring that the archbishop of Arles was the metropolitan, not Proculus of Marseille or Simplicius of Vienne. In a letter of May or June 514, Pope Symmachus (498–514) wrote to Archbishop Caesarius of Arles that, if the bishop of Aix, or any other bishop, should be summoned by the metropolitan and he refuses to obey, he should be submitted to ecclesiastical discipline.

=== Medieval Aix ===
In 737 the city of Aix was taken and sacked by the Saracens. The people fled to hilltop refuges, and the city was deserted. The damage to the ecclesiastical system was so extensive that it called forth a letter from Pope Hadrian I to Archbishop Bertherius of Vienne on 1 January 774. He advised the archbishop that King Charles (Charlemagne) had visited Rome with reports of the devastation, and had promised to help in restoring things. The Pope therefore sent letters informing the metropolitans that the status of eighty years earlier should be maintained, and that the privileges of metropolitans should be maintained even if, at the request of the Frankish kings, the pallium should be bestowed on a suffragan (subordinate) bishop. The situation as it had been in the time of Pope Leo II (662–663) should be restored.

Aix perhaps became an archbishopric only at the end of the 8th century; but it was a subordinate of the metropolitan archbishop of Arles. The Council of Frankfort, in 796, was uncertain about the status of Aix, and decided to refer the matter to the pope.

Up to the end of the eleventh century the cathedral of Aix was at Notre-Dame-de-la-Sed, which was situated to the west of the town, outside the walls. The new Cathedral of Saint-Sauveur was begun c. 1070, with the appeal for funds made by Archbishop Rostan de Fos (1056–1082). It was consecrated by Archbishop Petrus (III) (1101–1112) on 7 August 1103. He was assisted by Archbishop Gibelinus of Arles, Joannes of Cavaillon, Berengar of Fréjus, and Augerius of Riez, as well as the dignitaries of Aix: the provost, the archdeacon, the sacristan, two archpriests, and at least six canons. It is said that Bishop Foulques (c. 1115 – c. 1132) increased the number of canons in the cathedral chapter from twelve to twenty, and that he obtained the sanction of Pope Honorius II (1124–1130) for his actions. In 1693, and again in 1771, there were only two dignities and eighteen canons.

On 6 November 1097, Pope Urban II removed the diocese of Aix from the province of Arles and attached it as suffragan (subordinate) to the ecclesiastical province of Narbonne. In 1099, shortly after his coronation, Pope Paschal II repeated this decision in a letter to Archbishop Bertrand of Narbonne. Not content with that arrangement, the new archbishop, Pierre (III) (1101–1112), began a campaign to influence the papacy. He succeeded in obtaining the pallium from the new Pope Paschal II on 28 March 1104. This was the first time that an archbishop of Aix had ever been granted the use of the pallium.

=== Renaissance ===
The University of Aix was founded in 1409 by Pope Alexander V, which was confirmed by Count Louis (II) of Provence on 30 December 1413. Additional privileges were granted by King Henri IV in 1603 (a refoundation, in fact, since the university had become moribund in the face of the Huguenot challenge); by Louis XIII in 1622; by Louis XIV in 1660 and 1689; and by Louis XV in 1719. The archbishop of Aix was the chancellor of the university, ex officio. The rector of the university was elected. The university had faculties in theology, law, and medicine.

Count Louis II also established a Parliament for Provence in Aix, on 14 August 1415. When Count Charles III of Provence, the nephew of René of Anjou, died in 1481, he named as his heir King Louis XI of France and his heirs. Louis XII established a full royal administrative apparatus in Province in 1501.

In 1580 King Henri III of France established a network of seven Sovereign Ecclesiastical Chambers in France, to deal with legal matters arising from appeals concerning all taxes imposed by diocesan agencies, as well as appeals against decisions of the diocesan agencies. Aix was the center of one of these chambers, which included the dioceses of Aix, Apt, Gap, Fréjus, Riez, Sisteron; Marseille, Toulon, Orange (suffragans of Arles); Digne, Glandèves, Grasse, Senez and Vence (suffragans of Embrun). The archbishop of Aix was the president of the Chamber of Aix. The sees of Avignon, Carpentras, Cavaillon and Vaison were directly dependent upon the pope, and did not come under the jurisdiction of the king of France. They were therefore exempt from the jurisdiction of the Ecclesiastical Chamber.

=== Revolution ===
In 1790 the National Constituent Assembly decided to bring the French church under the control of the State. Civil government of the provinces was to be reorganized into new units called 'départements', originally intended to be 83 or 84 in number. The dioceses of the Catholic Church were to be reduced in number, to coincide as much as possible with the new departments. Since there were more than 130 bishoprics at the time of the Revolution, more than fifty dioceses needed to be suppressed and their territories consolidated. Clergy would need to take an oath of allegiance to the State and its Constitution, specified by the Civil Constitution of the Clergy, and they would become salaried officials of the State. Both bishops and priests would be elected by special 'electors' in each department. This meant schism, since bishops would no longer need to be approved (preconised) by the Papacy; the transfer of bishops, likewise, which had formerly been the exclusive prerogative of the pope in canon law, would be the privilege of the State; the election of bishops no longer lay with the Cathedral Chapters (which were all abolished), or other responsible clergy, or the Pope, but with electors who did not even have to be Catholics or Christians. All monasteries, convents and religious orders in France were dissolved, and their members were released from their vows by order of the National Constituent Assembly (which was uncanonical); their property was confiscated "for the public good", and sold to pay the bills of the French government. Cathedral Chapters were also dissolved.

A protest against the Civil Constitution of the Clergy was drawn up by the archbishop of Aix, Jean-de-Dieu-Raimond de Boisgelin de Cucé, and it was published on 30 August 1790 with the signatures of twenty-four bishops.

A new civil department, called "Bouches du Rhône", was created by the French Legislative Assembly, as part of a new Metropolitanate called "Métropole des côtes de la Méditerranée". The old diocese of Aix was suppressed, and a new "Diocese of Bouches du Rhône" was created, with its center at Aix; the head of the new diocese was named the metropolitan of the "Métropole des côtes de la Méditerranée". On 15 February 1791 the specially chosen electors met at Aix, and on 23 February elected the curé of Eyragues, Charles-Benoît Roux, as their bishop, by a vote of 365 out of a total of 510 electors. None of the Catholic bishops of the Midi had been willing to take the oath to the Constitution of 1790, and therefore Roux had to be consecrated in Paris, on 3 April, by the Constitutional Bishop of Paris, Jean-Baptiste Gobel. The consecration was valid, but canonically irregular, schismatic, and blasphemous (as a parody of genuine Catholic sacraments). Roux attempted to carry out his episcopal duties, but when the people of the Midi rose up against the National Convention, which had sanctioned the execution of King Louis XVI, Roux supported the insurgents. He went into hiding, but was arrested on 20 September 1793. In prison he secretly made his retraction of his errors to a non-Constitutional priest. He was executed on 5 April 1794 at Marseille by order of a Revolutionary Tribunal. The National Convention presently abolished all Religion, and substituted the Goddess of Reason. In 1795, after the Terror, when Reason was deposed and Religion restored, Aix was served by one of the vicars general of Constitutional Bishop Roux, Jean-Baptiste-Siméon Aubert, who was appointed Bishop of "Bouches du Rhône" on 29 April 1798.

=== Church of the Concordat ===
After the signing of the Concordat of 1801 with First Consul Napoleon Bonaparte, Pope Pius VII demanded the resignation of all bishops in France, in order to leave no doubt as to who was a legitimate bishop and who was a Constitutional imposter. He then immediately abolished all of the dioceses in France, for the same reason. Then he began to restore the old Ancien Régime dioceses, or most of them, though not with the same boundaries as before the Revolution. The diocese of Aix was revived by Pope Pius VII in his bull Qui Christi Domini of 29 November 1801. A new archbishop of Aix was appointed, Jérôme-Marie Champion de Cicé, and Constitutional Bishop Aubert made his submission to Cicé and then travelled to Rome and sought absolution from Pope Pius VII. Under the Concordat, however, Bonaparte exercised the same privileges as had the kings of France, especially that of nominating bishops for vacant dioceses, with the approval of the Pope. The practice continued until the Restoration in 1815, when the privilege of nomination returned to the hands of the King of France. On the occasion of the proclamation of the Empire in 1804, Archbishop de Cicé was made a member of the Legion of Honor and a Count of the Empire.

In accordance with the Concordat between Pope Pius VII and King Louis XVIII, signed on 11 June 1817, the transfer of Bishop de Bausset of Vannes to the Archdiocese of Aix was preconised on 1 October 1817. The archdiocese of Embrun remained suppressed, and its title was transferred to the Archdiocese of Aix. The archbishop of Aix-Embrun was metropolitan of the dioceses of Fréjus, Digne, and Gap. The Concordat, however, was never ratified by the French National Assembly, which had the reputation of being more royalist than the King, and therefore, ironically, Napoleonic legislation was never removed from the legal code (as agreed in the Concordat of 1817) and the terms of the Concordat of 1817 never became state law.

In 1881 and 1882, Jules Ferry was responsible for the enactment of the Jules Ferry Laws, establishing free primary education throughout France, and mandatory secular education. The five faculties of theology (at Paris, Bordeaux, Aix, Rouen, and Lyon), which had been supported financially by the State, were suppressed.

In the 1890s the archbishop of Aix, François Xavier Gouthe-Soulard, came into increasing disrepute, both with Paris and with the Vatican, because of his support for the extreme right-wing anti-republican Congregation of the Assumption (Assumptionists). A letter of support for their newspaper, La Croix, in which Gouthe-Soulard wrote, "We are not living under a Republic, we are living under Freemasonry," brought the Archbishop a penal condemnation from the French courts in 1892. He was fined 3000 francs and had his salary suspended. In 1896, La Croix founded an electoral committee, the Comité Justice-Égalité, with a view to opposing Jews, Masons, and Socialists at all levels in the electoral process. Pope Leo XIII and his Secretary of State Mariano Rampolla, who did not want to offend the republicans, while still supporting the Catholic faithful, tried to moderate the views of the Assumptionists, even to the point of sending messengers to the bishops of France to explain the Pope's electoral policy. For the election cycle of 1898, Senator Pierre Waldeck-Rousseau, who was a Catholic and a conservative, but a republican and far from being an anti-Semite, formed an electoral alliance between the Opportunists and the Rallié as he ran for President of the Republic. The Assumptionists and La Croix did everything they could to disrupt this conservative-moderate alliance, and in the superheated atmosphere following the Dreyfus Affair did considerable damage. Waldeck-Rousseau never forgave them, and began legal processes against the Assumptionists as an unauthorized congregation. When they were convicted in January 1900, Archbishop-Gouthe-Soulard and five other bishops published letters in La Croix, sympathizing with the plight of the Assumptionists. Nonetheless, they were ordered by the Pope to cease writing. Archbishop Gouthe-Soulard came to their defense, and criticized the Pope for cutting off the index finger of his own right hand. Waldeck-Rousseau then struck against the Archbishop, sending each of the six bishops a notice on 30 January that their defiance of the law was unacceptable, and informing them that their payments from the Caisses du Trésor were suspended. Gouthe-Soulard died on 9 September 1900, mooting any additional actions against him.

The hostile anti-republicanism of the Catholic right, however, continued to fuel anticlericalism. In 1904, two French bishops, Pierre Geay of Laval and Albert Le Nordez of Dijon, dared to announce that they were republicans, and they urged a reconciliation with the French Republic. They were ordered by Pope Pius X to resign (Le Nordez had been denounced as a freemason), and the French Chamber of Deputies replied by voting to sever diplomatic relations with the Vatican. Similarly, in 1904, as part of the liquidation of the Salesian Fathers in France, who did not have the status of an authorized congregation according to the law of 1 July 1901, the archbishop of Aix, François-Joseph Bonnefoy, had to appear in a court in Marseille to be granted title to the domaine de Saint-Pierre-de-Canon, which had been given the Salesians as a legacy; otherwise the property would have been confiscated by the State.

The high point came in 1905, with the Law on the Separation of the Churches and the State. This meant, among other things, the end of financial support of any religious group on the part of the French government and all of its subdivisions. An inventory was ordered of all places of worship that had received subsidies from the State, and all property not legally subject to a pious foundation was to be confiscated to the State. That was a violation of the Concordat of 1801. In addition the State demanded repayment of all loans and subsidies given the Churches during the term of the Concordat. On 11 February 1906, Pope Pius X responded with the encyclical Vehementer Nos, which condemned the Law of 1905 as a unilateral abrogation of the Concordat. He wrote, "That the State must be separated from the Church is a thesis absolutely false, a most pernicious error." Diplomatic relations were broken, and did not resume until 1921.

== Bishops and Archbishops ==
=== To 1000 ===
45? : Maximinus of Aix
80? : Sidonius of Aix
[ca. 394–ca. 401: Triferius]

- ca. 408–ca. 411: St. Lazarus
- c. 411–c.420: Maximus (I)
- c.420-c.430: Menelphalus
- c.430–439: Armentary.

[439?–475: Auxanius]

- 475–494: Basilius
- c. 524–c. 541: Maximus
- c. 549–c. 554: Avolus
- c. 566: Franco
- 581–585: Pientius
- 596 [–636]: Protasius
- ...
- 794 Ignotus
- ...
- 828: Benedictus

867?: Honoratus

- 878–879: Robert (I)
- 887: Matfridus
- 928–947: Odolricus
- 949: Israel
- 966?–979: Silvester
- c. 991–1018: Amalric I

=== 1000 to 1300 ===
- c. 1019: Pons (I.) (de Châteaurenard)
- 10xx?–1032: Amalric (II)
- 1032–ca. 1050: Petrus (I)
- c. 1050 – 1056: Pons (II.) de Châteaurenard
- 1056–1082: Rostan de Fos
- 1082–1101: Petrus (II) Gaufridi
- 1101–c. 1112: Petrus (III)
- 1115?–1131/1132: Fouques
- 1132–1157: Pons de Lubières
- 1162–1165: Peter (IV)
- 1165–1174: Hugues de Montlaur
- 1178–1180: Bertrand de Roquevaire
- 1180–1186: Henri
- 1186–1212: Gui de Fos
- 1212–1223: Bermond Cornut
- 1123–1251: Raimond Audibert
- 1251–1257: Philip I
- 1257–1273: Vicedomino de Vicedominis
- 1274–1282: Grimier Vicedominus
- 1283–1311: Rostan de Noves

=== 1300 to 1500 ===
- 1311–1312: Guillaume de Mandagot
- 1313–1318: Robert de Mauvoisin
- 1318–1320: Pierre des Prés
- 1321–1322: Pierre Auriol, O.Min.
- 1322–1329: Jacques de Concos, O.P.
- 1329–1348: Armand de Narcès
- 1348–1361: Arnaud de Pireto
- 1361–1368: Jean Peissoni
- 1368–1379: Giraud de Pousillac
- 1379–1395: Jean d'Agout (Avignon Obedience)
- 1396–1420: Thomas de Puppio (Avignon Obedience)

1395?–1405: Jacques (Roman Obedience)

- 1420–1421: Guillaume Fillastre
- 1422–1443: Avignon Nicolaï
- 1443–1447: Robert Roger
- 1447–1460: Robert Damiani
- 1460–1484: Olivier de Pennart
- 1484–1499: Philippe Herbert

=== 1500 to 1800 ===
- 1500–1503: Christophe de Brillac
- 1503–1506: François de Brillac
- 1506–1541: Pierre Filleul
- 1541–1550: Antoine Filleul
- 1551–1566: Jean de Saint-Chamond
- 1568–1571: Lorenzo Strozzi
- 1574–1576: Julien de Médicis
- 1576–1591: Alexandre Canigiani
- 1591–1597: Gilbert Genebrard
- 1599–1624: Paul Hurault de L'Hôpital
- 1624–1625: Gui Hurault de L'Hôpital
- 1626–1628: Alphonse-Louis du Plessis de Richelieu, O.Cist.

Sede vacante (1628–1631)

- 1631–1644: Louis de Bretel
- 1645–1648: Michel Mazarin (brother of Cardinal Jules Mazarin)
- 1655–1683: Jérôme Grimaldi
- 1693–1708: Daniel de Cosnac
- 1708–1729: Charles-Gaspard-Guillaume de Vintimille du Luc
- 1729–1770: Jean-Baptiste de Brancas
- 1771–1801: Jean de Dieu-Raymond de Boisgelin de Cucé

- 1791–1794: Charles-Benoît Roux (Constitutional Bishop)
- 1798–1801: Jean-Baptiste-Siméon Aubert (Constitutional Bishop)

=== From 1800 ===
- Jérôme-Marie Champion de Cicé (9 Apr 1802 – 22 Aug 1810)

Sede vacante (1810–1817)

- Pierre-François-Gabriel-Raymond-Ignace-Ferdinand de Bausset-Roquefort (8 Aug 1817 – 29 Jan 1829)
- Charles-Alexandre de Richery (8 Feb 1829 – 25 Nov 1830)
- Jacques Raillon (14 Dec 1830 Appointed – 13 Feb 1835 Died)
- Joseph Bernet (6 Oct 1835 Appointed – 5 Jul 1846 Died)
- Pierre-Marie-Joseph Darcimoles (5 Dec 1846 Appointed – 11 Jan 1857 Died)
- Georges-Claude-Louis-Pie Chalandon (4 Feb 1857 Appointed – 28 Feb 1873 Died)
- Théodore-Augustin Forcade, M.E.P. (21 Mar 1873 Appointed – 12 Sep 1885 Died)
- François Xavier Gouthe-Soulard (2 Mar 1886 Appointed – 9 Sep 1900 Died)
- François-Joseph-Edwin Bonnefoy (5 Apr 1901 Appointed – 20 Apr 1920 Died)
- Maurice-Louis-Marie Rivière (9 Jul 1920 Appointed – 28 Sep 1930 Died)
- Emmanuel Coste (28 Jul 1931 Appointed – 18 Jan 1934 Died)
- Clément-Emile Roques (24 Dec 1934 Appointed – 11 May 1940 Appointed, Archbishop of Rennes))
- Florent-Michel-Marie-Joseph du Bois de la Villerabel (11 May 1940 Appointed – 13 Dec 1944 Resigned)
- Charles-Marie-Joseph-Henri de Provenchères (3 Nov 1945 Appointed – 30 Nov 1978 Retired)
- Bernard Louis Auguste Paul Panafieu (30 Nov 1978 Appointed – 24 Aug 1994 Appointed, Coadjutor Archbishop of Marseille)
- Louis-Marie Billé (5 May 1995 Appointed – 10 Jul 1998 Appointed, Archbishop of Lyon)
- Claude Feidt (17 Jun 1999 Appointed – 29 Mar 2010 Resigned)
- Christophe Dufour (20 May 2008 Appointed Coadjutor Archbishop; 29 Mar 2010 Succeeded – 5 Jul 2022 Retired) (fr)
- Christian Delarbre (5 Jul 2022 Appointed – present)

== See also ==
- Catholic Church in France
- List of Catholic dioceses in France
- Croix de Provence on the Montagne Sainte-Victoire

== Sources ==
=== Reference works ===
- Gams, Pius Bonifatius (1873). Series episcoporum Ecclesiae catholicae: quotquot innotuerunt a beato Petro apostolo. Ratisbon: Typis et Sumptibus Georgii Josephi Manz. (Use with caution; obsolete)
- Jean, Armand (1891). Les évêques et les archevêques de France depuis 1682 jusqu'à 1801 (in French). Paris: A. Picard.
- Eubel, Conradus, ed. (1913). Hierarchia catholica, Tomus 1 (second ed.). Münster: Libreria Regensbergiana. (in Latin)
- Eubel, Conradus, ed. (1914). Hierarchia catholica, Tomus 2 (second ed.). Münster: Libreria Regensbergiana. (in Latin)
- Gulik, Guilelmus (1923). Eubel, Conradus (ed.). Hierarchia catholica, Tomus 3 (second ed.). Münster: Libreria Regensbergiana.
- Gauchat, Patritius (Patrice) (1935). Hierarchia catholica IV (1592–1667). Münster: Libraria Regensbergiana.
- Ritzler, Remigius; Sefrin, Pirminus (1952). Hierarchia catholica medii et recentis aevi V (1667–1730). Patavii: Messagero di S. Antonio.
- Ritzler, Remigius; Sefrin, Pirminus (1958). Hierarchia catholica medii et recentis aevi VI (1730–1799). Patavii: Messagero di S. Antonio.
- Ritzler, Remigius; Sefrin, Pirminus (1968). Hierarchia Catholica medii et recentioris aevi sive summorum pontificum, S. R. E. cardinalium, ecclesiarum antistitum series... A pontificatu Pii PP. VII (1800) usque ad pontificatum Gregorii PP. XVI (1846) (in Latin). Vol. VII. Monasterii: Libr. Regensburgiana.
- Remigius Ritzler; Pirminus Sefrin (1978). Hierarchia catholica Medii et recentioris aevi... A Pontificatu PII PP. IX (1846) usque ad Pontificatum Leonis PP. XIII (1903) (in Latin). Vol. VIII. Il Messaggero di S. Antonio.
- Pięta, Zenon (2002). Hierarchia catholica medii et recentioris aevi... A pontificatu Pii PP. X (1903) usque ad pontificatum Benedictii PP. XV (1922) (in Latin). Vol. IX. Padua: Messagero di San Antonio. ISBN 978-88-250-1000-8.

=== Studies ===
- Albanés, Joseph Hyacinthe; Ulysse Chevalier (1899). Gallia christiana novissima: Aix, Apt, Fréjus, Gap, Riez et Sisteron (in Latin). Montbéliard: Société anonyme d'imprimerie montbéliardaise.
- Belin, Ferdinand (1896). Histoire de l'ancienne université de Provence, ou Histoire de la fameuse université d'Aix: période. 1409–1679 (in French). Paris: A. Picard et fils.
- Clouzot, Étienne (editor) (1923). Pouillés des provinces d'Aix, d'Arles et d'Embrun Paris:Imprimerie nationale [Recueil des historiens de la France, Pouillés, Tome VIII]. (in French) [lists of benefices]
- Constantin, M. (1890). Les paroisses du doicèse d'Aix: leurs souvenirs et leurs monuments ... Paroisses de l'ancien diocèse d'Aix (in French). Aix: Makaire.
- Dolan, Claire (1981). Entre tours et clochers: les gens d'Église à Aix-en-Provence au XVIe siècle. (Sherbrooke, Québec, Canada: Editions de l'Université de Sherbrooke/Aix-en-Province-Edisud).
- Duchesne, Louis (1907). Fastes épiscopaux de l'ancienne Gaule: I. Provinces du Sud-Est. Paris: Fontemoing. pp. 274–277. second edition (in French)
- Fisquet, Honore (1864). La France pontificale (Gallia Christiana): Metropole d'Aix: Aix. Arles, Embrun (in French). Paris: Etienne Repos. p. 27.
- Goyau, Georges (1909), "France", in: Herbermann, C. G., ed. (1909). The Catholic Encyclopedia: An International Work of Reference on the Constitution, Doctrine, Discipline, and History of the Catholic Church. Vol. VI. New York: Robert Appleton. pp. 177–190..
- Haitze, Pierre Joseph de (1863). L'épiscopat métropolitain d'Aix (in French). Aix: Makaire.
- Palanque, Jean-Rémy, ed. (1975). Le Diocèse d'Aix-en-Provence (in French). Paris: Editions Beauchesne. GGKEY:3Z8D711XR1S.
- Pascal, Adrien (1925). Le Clergé du diocese d'Aix pendant le XIX' siècle. (Aix- en-Provence 1925) (in French)
- Pisani, Paul (1907). Répertoire biographique de l'épiscopat constitutionnel (1791–1802) (in French). Paris: A. Picard et fils. pp. 323–325.
- Société bibliographique (France) (1907). L'épiscopat français depuis le Concordat jusqu'à la Séparation (1802–1905). Paris: Librairie des Saints-Pères.

=== External references ===
- (in French) Centre national des Archives de l'Église de France, L'Épiscopat francais depuis 1919, retrieved: 2016-12-24.
- David M. Cheney, Catholic-Hierarchy: Aix. Retrieved: 2016-07-05 ^{[self-published]}
