= 1912 in film =

The year 1912 in film involved some significant events.

== Events ==
- February – Babelsberg Studio outside Berlin begins operation with the shooting of The Dance of the Dead (Der Totentanz) by Danish director Urban Gad, starring Asta Nielsen (released September 7).
- April 15 – Sinking of the Titanic: British passenger liner Titanic sinks having struck an iceberg in the Atlantic Ocean on her maiden voyage from the United Kingdom to the United States, killing more than 1,500. This is depicted in many works of popular culture, including films, beginning with the May 16 U.S. release Saved from the Titanic, starring and co-written by Dorothy Gibson, who is herself a survivor of the disaster.
- April 30 – Universal Film Manufacturing Company is founded in New York, the oldest surviving film studio in the United States.
- May 8 – Famous Players Film Company, the forerunner of Paramount Pictures, is founded by Adolph Zukor.
- May 18 – Shree Pundalik by Dadasaheb Torne, the first Indian film, is released.
- June 8 – New York Motion Picture Company is merged with Universal, giving Universal a studio in Edendale, Los Angeles.
- July 4 – Mack Sennett, who has previously worked as an actor and comedy director with D. W. Griffith, forms a new company with New York City entrepreneur Adam Kessel, Keystone Studios. It will play an important role in developing slapstick comedy as the home to the Keystone Cops, English actor Charlie Chaplin, and others.
- July 12 – Queen Elizabeth is the first film released by Famous Players.
- July 26 – Edison Studios releases What Happened to Mary, the first ever motion picture serial.
- December 17–23 – Berlin Cinematograph Congress and Exhibition in Germany.
- Edison introduces the Home Kinetoscope, a home film-projector which uses a 22 mm print consisting of three rows of frames.
- Pathé releases Pathe Kok, their first entry into the amateur market, with a gauge of 28 mm.
- Alexander F. Victor improves on the 17.5 mm format with his Duoscope, which uses two center perforations instead of the typical one.
- Bell & Howell introduce the first all-metal camera, the 2709 35mm.

== Notable films ==
Films produced in the United States unless stated otherwise

=== A ===
- At It Again (lost), directed by and starring Mack Sennett, with Mabel Normand

=== B ===
- The Beautiful Leukanida (Prekrasnaya Lyukanida), directed by Władysław Starewicz – (Russia)

=== C ===
- The Cameraman's Revenge (Mest' kinematograficheskogo operatora), directed by Władysław Starewicz – (Russia)
- The Charge of the Light Brigade, directed by J. Searle Dawley
- Cleopatra, directed by Charles L. Gaskill, starring Helen Gardner
- The Conquest of the Pole (À la conquête du pôle), directed by Georges Méliès – (France)
- Custer's Last Fight, directed by Francis Ford

=== D ===
- A Dash Through the Clouds, directed by Mack Sennett, starring Mabel Normand and American aviation pioneer Philip Parmelee
- Dr. Jekyll and Mr. Hyde, directed by Lucius Henderson, starring James Cruze, based on the 1886 novella by Robert Louis Stevenson

=== F ===
- For His Son, directed by D. W. Griffith, starring Blanche Sweet
- For the Cause of the South (lost), directed by Bannister Merwin
- Friends, directed by D. W. Griffith, starring Mary Pickford, Lionel Barrymore and Harry Carey
- From the Manger to the Cross, directed by Sidney Olcott
- From the Submerged, directed by Theodore Wharton

=== H ===
- How a Mosquito Operates, directed by Winsor McCay

=== I ===
- In Nacht und Eis (In Night and Ice), directed by Mime Misu – (Germany)
- The Independence of Romania (Independenţa României), directed by Aristide Demetriade – (Romania)
- The Invaders, directed by Francis Ford and Thomas H. Ince

=== K ===
- The Knight of the Snows (Le Chevalier des Neiges), directed by Georges Méliès – (France)

=== L ===
- The Land Beyond the Sunset, directed by Harold M. Shaw

=== M ===
- Making an American Citizen, directed by Alice Guy-Blaché
- Man's Genesis, directed by D. W. Griffith, starring Mae Marsh and Robert Harron
- The Miracle, directed by Michel-Antoine Carré, based on the 1911 play by Karl Vollmöller – (GB)
- Das Mirakel (The Miracle), directed by Mime Misu, based on the 1911 play by Karl Vollmöller – (Germany)
- The Musketeers of Pig Alley, directed by D. W. Griffith, starring Lillian Gish

=== N ===
- The New York Hat, directed by D. W. Griffith, starring Mary Pickford and Lionel Barrymore

=== O ===
- Oliver Twist, directed by Thomas Bentley, based on the 1838 novel by Charles Dickens – (GB)

=== Q ===
- Queen Elizabeth (Les Amours de la reine Élisabeth), directed by Louis Mercanton and Henri Desfontaines, starring Sarah Bernhardt – (France)

=== R ===
- Richard III, directed by André Calmettes and James Keane, starring Frederick Warde, based on the 16th-century play by William Shakespeare – (US/France)

=== S ===
- Saved from the Titanic (lost), directed by Étienne Arnaud, starring Dorothy Gibson
- The Star of Bethlehem (incomplete), directed by Lawrence Marston

=== U ===
- An Unseen Enemy, directed by D. W. Griffith, starring Lillian Gish, Dorothy Gish and Harry Carey

=== V ===
- The Voyage of the Bourrichon Family (Le Voyage de la famille Bourrichon), directed by Georges Méliès – (France)

=== W ===
- The Water Nymph, directed by Mack Sennett, starring Mabel Normand
- What Happened to Mary, film serial directed by Ashley Miller and Charles Brabin, starring Mary Fuller
- With Our King and Queen Through India (incomplete), documentary produced by Charles Urban – (GB)

== Births ==
- January 3 – Armand Lohikoski, Finnish director (died 2005)
- January 8 – José Ferrer, Puerto Rican-American actor and director (died 1992)
- January 13 – Paul Birch, American actor (died 1969)
- February 4 – James Craig, American actor (died 1985)
- February 5 – Willard Parker, American actor (died 1996)
- February 19 – Saul Chaplin, American film composer (died 1997)
- February 19 – Dorothy Janis, American actress (died 2010)
- February 21 – Arline Judge, American actress (died 1974)
- February 26 – Dane Clark, American actor (died 1998)
- March 22 – Karl Malden, American actor (died 2009)
- April 5 – Gordon Jones, American actor (died 1963)
- April 8 – Sonja Henie, Norwegian Olympic ice-skater, actress (died 1969)
- April 11
  - John Larkin, American actor (died 1965)
  - Gusti Wolf, Austrian actress (died 2007)
- April 12 – Walt Gorney, Austrian-American actor (died 2004)
- April 16 – Catherine Scorsese, American actress (died 1997)
- April 18 – Wendy Barrie, English actress (died 1978)
- April 29 – Richard Carlson, American actor and director (died 1977)
- May 9 – Pedro Armendáriz, Mexican actor (died 1963)
- May 18 – Perry Como, American singer, actor (died 2001)
- May 23
  - Marius Goring, English actor (died 1998)
  - John Payne, American actor (died 1989)
- May 29 – Iris Adrian, American actress (died 1994)
- May 31 – Dave O'Brien, American actor, director, writer (died 1969)
- June 1 – Doris Wishman, American filmmaker (died 2002)
- June 26 – Jay Silverheels, Canadian actor (Tonto) (died 1980)
- July 4 – Viviane Romance, French actress (died 1991)
- July 5 – Ilona Massey, Hungarian-born American actress (died 1974)
- August 1 – Henry Jones, American actor (died 1999)
- August 12 – Samuel Fuller, American director (died 1997)
- August 15 – Wendy Hiller, English actress (died 2003)
- August 23 – Gene Kelly, American actor (died 1996)
- August 25 – Ted Key, writer (died 2008)
- August 29 – Barry Sullivan, American actor (died 1974)
- September 5
  - Kristina Söderbaum, Swedish-born German actress (died 2001)
  - Frank Thomas, American animator (died 2004)
- September 10 – Mary Walter, Filipina actress (died 1993)
- September 21 – Chuck Jones, American animator (died 2002)
- September 23 – Martha Scott, American actress (died 2003)
- September 29 – Michelangelo Antonioni, Italian director (died 2007)
- October 10 – Rudy Bond, American actor (died 1982)
- October 11 – Betty Noyes American singer/dubber (died 1987)
- October 12 – Peer Guldbrandsen, Danish screenwriter, actor, film director and producer (died 1996)
- October 13 – Cornel Wilde, Hungarian-born American actor (died 1989)
- October 31 –
  - Dale Evans, American actress (died 2001)
  - Ollie Johnston, American animator (died 2008)
- November 5 – Paul Dehn, English screenwriter and poet (died 1976)
- November 8 – June Havoc, American actress (died 2010)
- November 21 – Eleanor Powell, American dancer, actress (died 1982)
- November 24 – Garson Kanin, American writer (died 1999)
- November 30 – Hugo del Carril, Argentine film actor, film director and tango singer (died 1989)
- December 11 – Carlo Ponti, Italian producer (died 2007)

== Deaths ==
- March 30 – Karl May, writer, Apache Gold (born 1842)
- April 15 – Jacques Futrelle, writer, The Rivals of Sherlock Holmes, (perished in the Titanic) (born 1875)
- April 20 – Bram Stoker, writer, Dracula (born 1847)
- May 14 – August Strindberg, writer, Miss Julie (born 1849)
- May 19 – Bolesław Prus, writer, Faraon (born 1847)
- June 1 – Philip Orin Parmelee, actor (with Mabel Normand in A Dash Through the Clouds); pioneer aviator for the Wright brothers (born 1887)
- July 1 – Harriet Quimby, writer (seven scenarios for D.W. Griffith); actress in one film; pioneer American aviator (born 1875)
- December 14 – Harry Cashman, comedy producer and actor for the Chicago-based Essanay company.

== Film debuts ==
- John Barrymore – The Dream of a Moving Picture Director (as Jack Barrymore)(*debatable; debut occurred much earlier)
- May Buckley - Paid in His Own Coin
- Frank Borzage – On Secret Service (short)
- Charlotte Burton – The Would-Be Heir (short)
- Lon Chaney – The Honor of the Family (short) (unconfirmed)
- Dorothy Gish – An Unseen Enemy (short)
- Lillian Gish – An Unseen Enemy (short)
- Louise Glaum – Brave Heart's Hidden Love (short)
- Mildred Harris – The Post Telegrapher (short)
- Cleo Madison – A Business Buccaneer (short)
- Mary Miles Minter – The Nurse (short) (as Juliet Shelby)
- Antonio Moreno – Iola's Promise (short)
- Warner Oland – Pilgrim's Progress
- Olga Petrova – Departure of a Grand Old Man (short)
- Victor Sjöström – director, A Ruined Life; actor, The Gardener
- Frederick Warde – Richard III
