= List of French films of 1912 =

A list of films produced in France in 1912.

Title	Director	Cast	Genre	Notes
Absalon				
L'Accident				
L'Affaire du collier de la reine				
L'Agence Cacahouète				
Agénor et la main qui vole				
Agénor le bien-aimé				
Alerte!				
Les Allumettes fantaisistes				
L'Amazone masquée				
L'Ambitieuse				
La hantise	Louis Feuillade	Renée Carl, René Navarre		
Les Amis de la mort				
Amour d'automne				
Les Amours de la reine Élisabeth	Henri Desfontaines	Sarah Bernhardt, Lou Tellegen		
Le Chevalier des Neiges	Georges Méliès			
À la conquête du pôle	Georges Méliès		Science fiction fantasy	
Le Roman de Max	Max Linder	Max Linder, Lucy d'Orbel	Romantic comedy/fantasy	
Marie Tudor	Albert Capellani	Jeanne Delvair, Paul Capellani	Historical	
Le Voyage de la famille Bourrichon	Georges Méliès		Comedy	

== See also ==
- 1912 in France
