= Gabrielle Colonna-Romano =

French actress (1888 – 1981)

Gabrielle Colonna-Romano / Colanna Romano
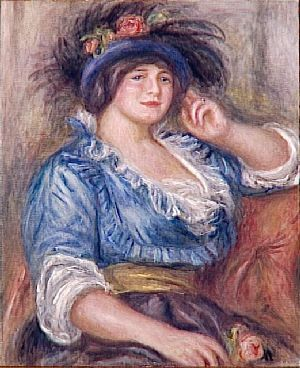
- Jeune femme à la rose, by Pierre-Auguste Renoir (1913), portraying Gabrielle Colonna-Romano
- Born: Gabrielle Colonna-Romano; January 17, 1888
- Died: February 2, 1981 (aged 93)
- Resting place: Rueil-Malmaison cemetery
- Occupations: Stage and film actress
- Spouse(s): 1) Alfred Edwards; 2) Pierre Alcover

Gabrielle Colonna-Romano (January 17, 1888 – February 2, 1981) or Colanna Romano (name as a cinema actress), born Gabrielle Dreyfus, was a French actress, famous as a tragedian, sociétaire of the Comédie-Française from 1913 to 1936, and as a student of Sarah Bernhardt. She appeared in several plays and poetry readings (notably of works by the Symbolist poet Saint-Pol-Roux). She had an affair with Pierre Renoir, and modeled for several paintings by his father Auguste Renoir, notably Jeune femme à la rose (1913). In England, she met and became friends with Marie Bell, on whose advice she decided to present herself to the Conservatoire.

She was the sixth and final wife of the millionaire press-magnate Alfred Edwards, and after his death married the actor Pierre Alcover. She and Alcover are buried together in the Rueil-Malmaison cemetery.

She gives her name to the "Prix Colonna-Romano de tragédie classique" at the Conservatoire national supérieur d'art dramatique in Paris.

In September 2026 an oil painting by Pierre-Auguste Renoir, Portrait of Madame Colonna Romano (c.1913), was stolen from the Musée Renoir in Cagnes-sur-Mer. The work had an estimated value of €9 million (£7.7m; $10.5m).

== Filmography ==
- 1908 : Hamlet, directed by Henri Desfontaines (Gertrude)
- 1910 : Le Scarabée d'or, directed by Henri Desfontaines
- 1910 : Hop-Frog, directed by Henri Desfontaines
- 1911 : Le Roman de la momie (film), directed by Henri Desfontaines
- 1912 : Antar, directed by Chékri Ganem
- 1913 : L'Honneur, directed by Henri Pouctal
