= 2026 Musée Renoir theft =

Theft of two Renoir paintings in France

Coordinates: 43°40′04″N 7°09′25″E

- Musée Renoir, France
- Date: 8 September 2026
- Time: 5:48 (CEST)
- Location: Cagnes-sur-Mer, Alpes-Maritimes, France
- Type: Art theft
- Arrests: Six men
- Charges: Four men were charged with organised theft and other offences
- Stolen value: €9 million (£7.7m; $10.5m) each

On 8 September 2026, four artworks by Pierre-Auguste Renoir were stolen from the Musée Renoir in Cagnes-sur-Mer, Alpes-Maritimes in France, though two of the paintings were later abandoned by the thieves and found in the museum's garden. The works had an estimated value of €9 million (£7.7m; $10.5m) each.

== Theft ==
On the morning of 8 September, two thieves broke into the Musée Renoir in Cagnes-sur-Mer, and stole four paintings by Renoir before dropping two during their escape. According to mayor Bryan Masson, the museum's alarm was triggered at 5:48 a.m. CEST, with police arriving five minutes later. The thieves, wearing helmets, gloves, and camouflage fatigues, cut through the museum's wire fencing with an electric knife and hacksaw to access the museum grounds, timing the theft to coincide with a shift change in security personnel. They cut the clips securing the paintings and hastily escaped the scene due to the alarm system activating. They abandoned two paintings while fleeing, which were later found in the museum's garden.

== Paintings stolen ==
French regional newspaper Nice-Matin reported that the paintings taken were:

- Jeune Femme au puits (1886)
- Portrait of Madame Colonna Romano (c. 1913)
- Portrait of Madame Stephen Pichon (1895)
- Coco lisant (1905)

Each of the paintings had an estimated value of approximately €9 million (£7.7m; $10.5m). The two paintings reportedly dropped by the thieves were the Portrait of Madame Stephen Pichon and Coco lisant while the two still missing were Madame Colonna Romano and Jeune Femme au puits.

== Investigation ==
On 8 October, Nice-Matin reported that six people, including the two suspected burglars, had been arrested in France.

On 9 October, the recovery of the paintings was confirmed by Mayor Masson, who said: "These two paintings are far more than works of art. They are part of our city's history, our cultural heritage and the legacy Auguste Renoir left to Cagnes-sur-Mer."

On 12 October, four men, including the two key suspects, were charged with organised theft and other offences.

== Gallery ==
Jeune Femme au puits (1886), stolen and recovered in October

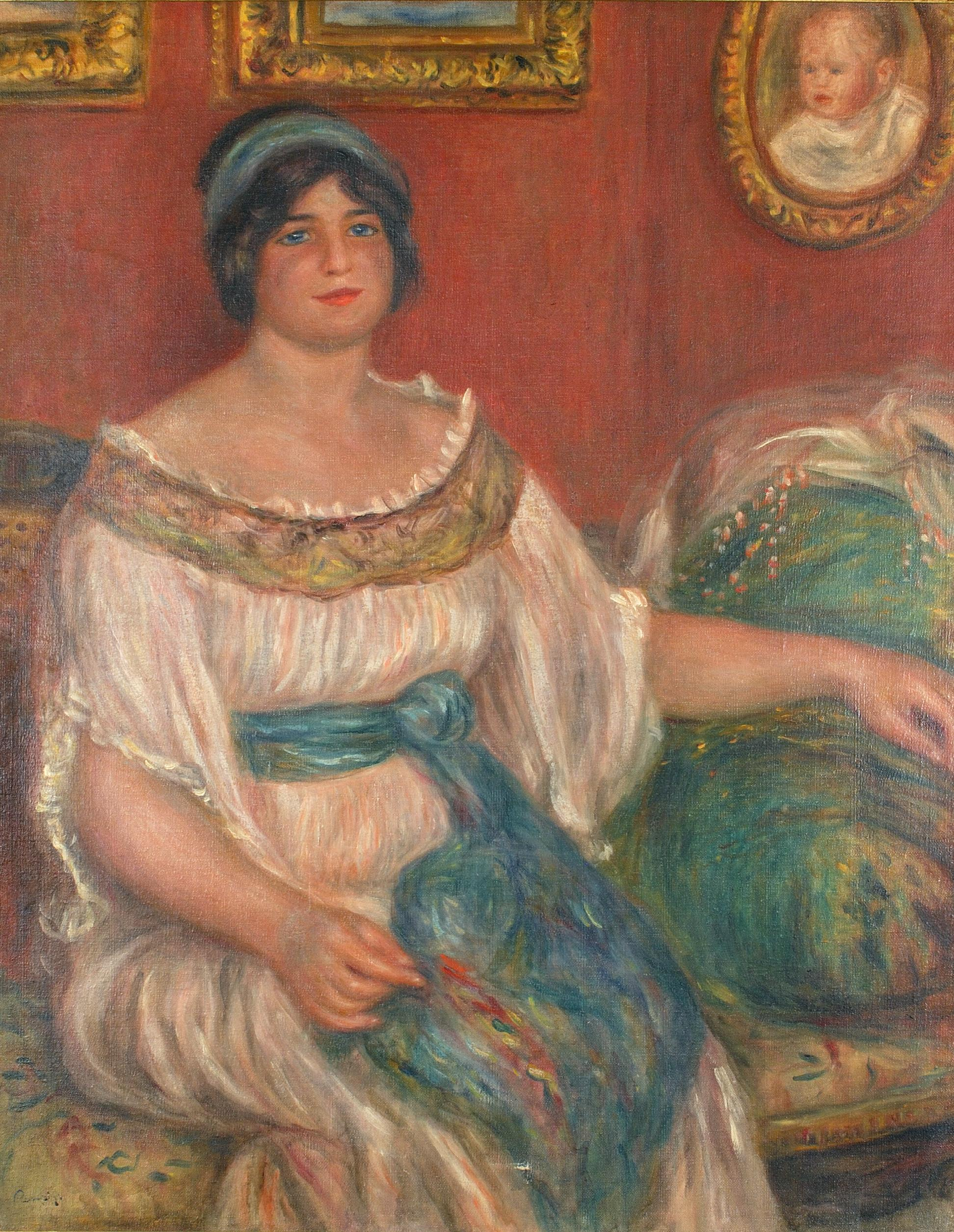
Portrait of Madame Colonna Romano (c. 1913), stolen and recovered in October

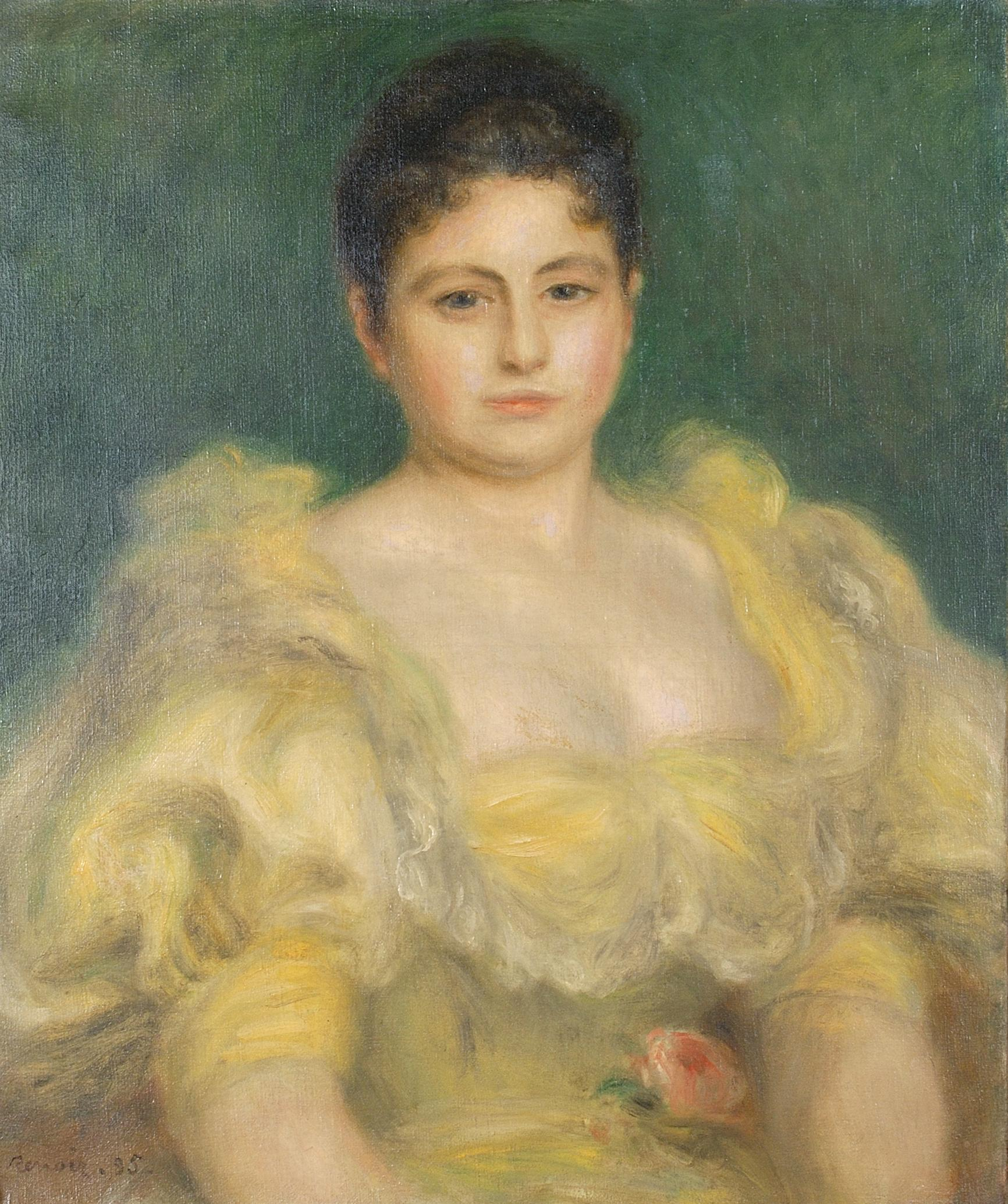
Portrait of Madame Stephen Pichon (1895), dropped by the thieves

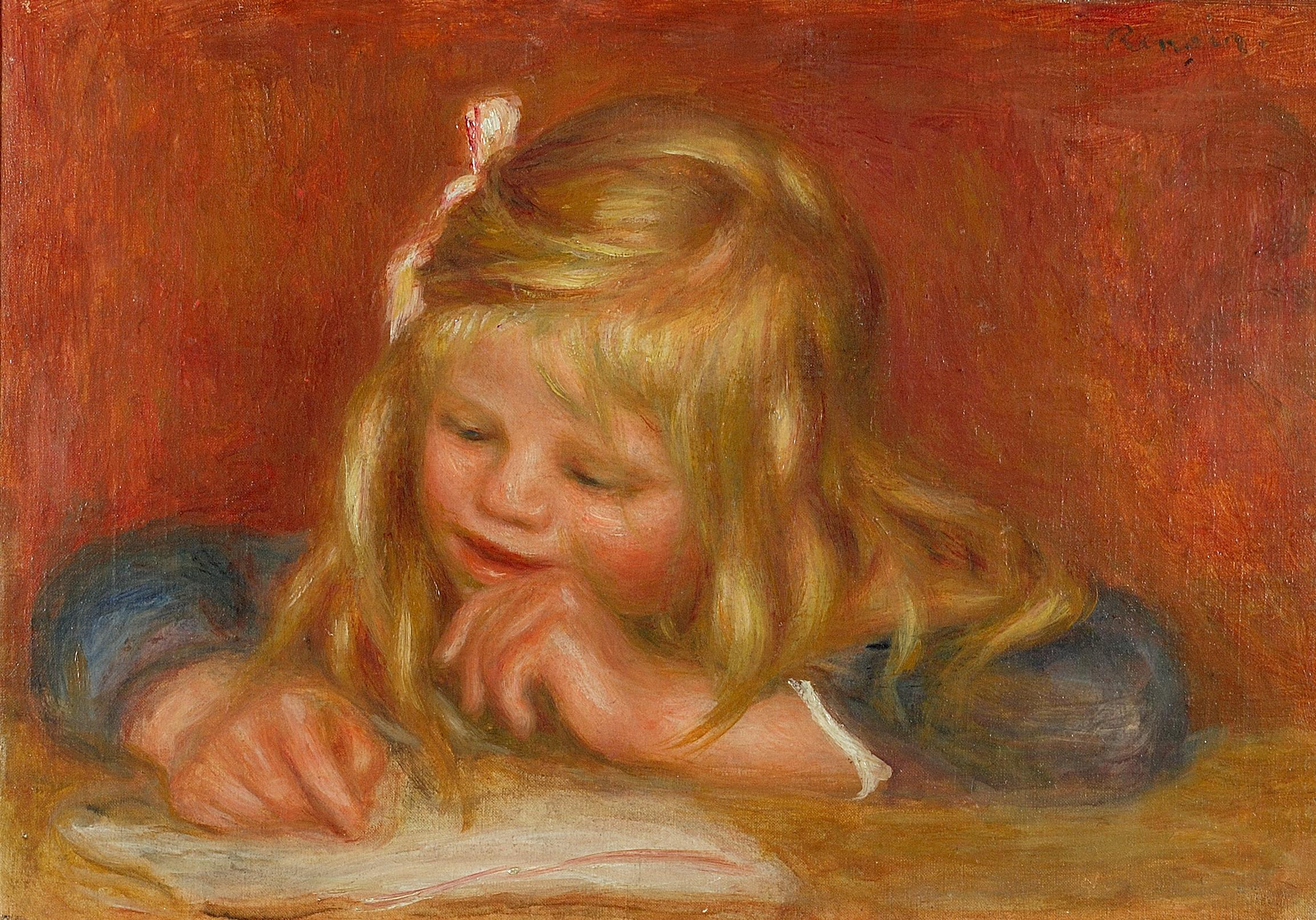
Coco lisant (1905), dropped by the thieves

== See also ==
- 2025 Drents Museum heist
- 2025 Louvre heist
- List of paintings by Pierre-Auguste Renoir
