= An Otter Study =

- Screenshot from the film
- Production company: Kineto
- Release date: 1912
- Country: United Kingdom
- Language: Silent

An Otter Study is a 1912 British short black-and-white silent documentary film, produced by Kineto, featuring an otter in its natural habitat, including groundbreaking footage of underwater hunting scenes. The film provided a novel treatment of the creature, which had previously appeared on film only as the victim of hunt films, with the unique underwater footage, shot by a cameraman behind glass in a tank concealed on the bed of the river in the opening scene, and a concluding scene, excised from the surviving print, in which it escapes the hunters. It was long thought lost until footage from a 1920s Visual Education re-release of the film, re-edited under the supervision of Professor J Arthur Thomson of Aberdeen University's Natural History Department, was rediscovered.
