= Louis Valtat =

French painter (1869–1952)

Louis Valtat (French pronunciation: [lwi valta]; 8 August 1869 – 2 January 1952) was a French painter and printmaker associated with the Fauves ("the wild beasts", so named for their wild use of color), who first exhibited together in 1905 at the Salon d'Automne. He is noted as a key figure in the stylistic transition in painting from Monet to Matisse.

== Life and work ==
Louis Valtat was born on 8 August 1869 in Dieppe, in the Normandy region of France, into a wealthy family of ship owners. Valtat spent many of his childhood years in Versailles, a suburb of Paris, where he attended secondary school at the Lycée Hoche (near the Palace of Versailles). Encouraged by his father, an amateur landscape painter himself, Valtat became interested in art. At age 17, deciding to pursue an artistic career, he applied to the École des Beaux-Arts de Paris. He was accepted, and in 1887 Valtat moved to Paris to enroll at the Ecole, where he studied with the well-known academic artists Gustave Boulanger (1824–1888), Jules Lefebvre (1836–1911), and later with Jean-Joseph Benjamin-Constant (1845–1902).

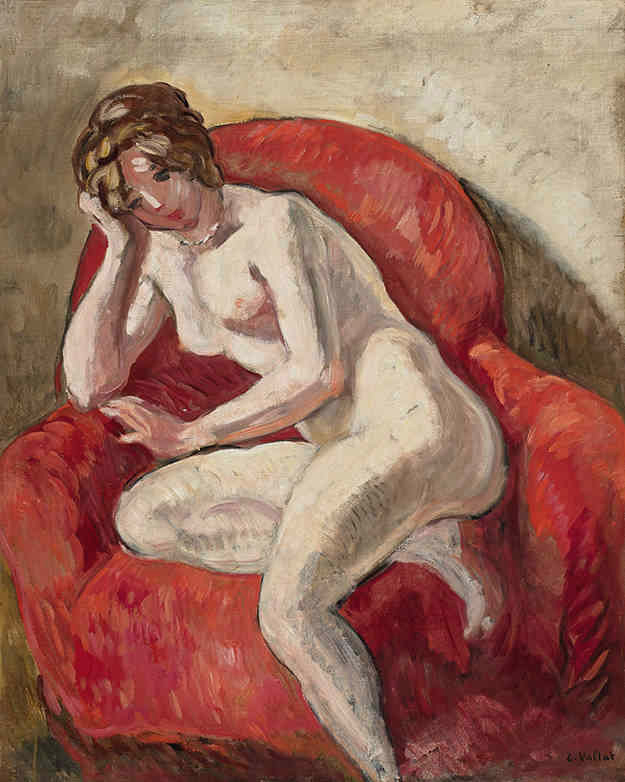
Louis Valtat, 1913, Nu au fauteuil (Nu sur fond rose), oil on canvas, 81.4 x 65.4 cm, private collection. Exhibited Exposició d'Art francès d'Avantguarda, Galeries Dalmau, Barcelona, 1920

Valtat subsequently studied at the Académie Julian (Julian Academy) under Jules Dupré (1811–1889), a landscape painter of the Barbizon school. Among his fellow students were Albert André (1869–1954), who became a close friend, as well as Maurice Denis (1870–1943), Pierre Bonnard (1867–1947), and Édouard Vuillard (1868–1940). These last three, calling themselves "Nabis" (after the Hebrew word meaning prophets), were influenced by Paul Gauguin's (1848–1903) Synthetist method of painting based on the use of simple forms, pure colors, and large patterns. While Valtat remained detached from that movement, he learned from them.

In 1890, upon winning the Jauvin d’Attainville prize, Valtat established his own studio at rue La Glaciere in Paris. He made his debut in 1893 at the Salon of Independent Artists, displaying several paintings depicting street scenes of the neighborhood surrounding his art studio. One of those paintings, titled Sur Le Boulevard (On The Boulevard, 1893) was noted by the art critic Félix Fénéon. During this early period in his career, Valtat used the spontaneous light touches of Impressionism (although with bordered objects) and the colorful dots found in Pointillism. Two examples representing Valtat's work during this period include Péniches (Barges, 1892) and the Pommiers (The Apple Trees, 1894). As noted by Cogniat, Péniches has the impressionistic rendering of the mobile reflections of rippling water while Pommiers is "alive with the dazzling brilliance of sunlit reds and yellows intensified by the stippled strokes of green".

Valtat exhibited widely during his career. In 1894, he collaborated with both Henri de Toulouse-Lautrec and Albert André in creating the decor for the Paris theater "L'Œuvre" at the request of Lugné Poë.

Valtat suffered from tuberculosis, and he spent many autumn/winter seasons along the Mediterranean coast in Banyuls, Antheor and Saint-Tropez. Beginning in 1900, Valtat made several journeys by bicycle to visit Auguste Renoir at the Maison de la Poste in Cagnes. There, Valtat made several portrait drawings of Renoir on which he based a subsequent woodcut, and the two artists collaborated on a sculpture of Cézanne. Another friend of Valtat was Paul Signac, whom he visited often, traveling in a small Bollée motorcar that he acquired ca. 1904 from Signac in exchange for his painting Women at the Seashore. During his time spent near the Mediterranean, Valtat intensified his use of color and began to express his Fauvist tendencies, particularly in painting seascapes. Art historian Natalie Henderson Lee identifies Valtat as a "proto-Fauve", although he remained somewhat apart from the Fauve group, and never adopted their extreme boldness in the treatment of form and color.

After 1914 he worked in Paris and in areas near Rouen and Versailles. The subjects of his paintings included flowers, landscapes, and scenes of contemporary life, and he produced many prints. Valtat continued to paint until 1948, when the glaucoma from which he had suffered for several years resulted in the loss of his sight. He died on 2 January 1952 in Paris.

== Selected works ==
The following are some paintings by Louis Valtat:

- Composition avec trois vases (Composition with Three Vases)
- La Dentelliere, c. 1906, oil on canvas
- Les Rochers Rouges dans la Mer (Red Rocks by the Sea), circa 1903
- Péniches (Barges), 1892
- Pommiers (The Apple Trees), 1894
- Sur Le Boulevard (On The Boulevard), 1893
- Vase Tulipe et Violettes (Tulips and Violets), 1925
- Voilieres au Port à Ouistrehamm (Ouistrehamm), ca. 1930
- Stil life With Apples, Norton Art Museum, West Palm Beach, Florida
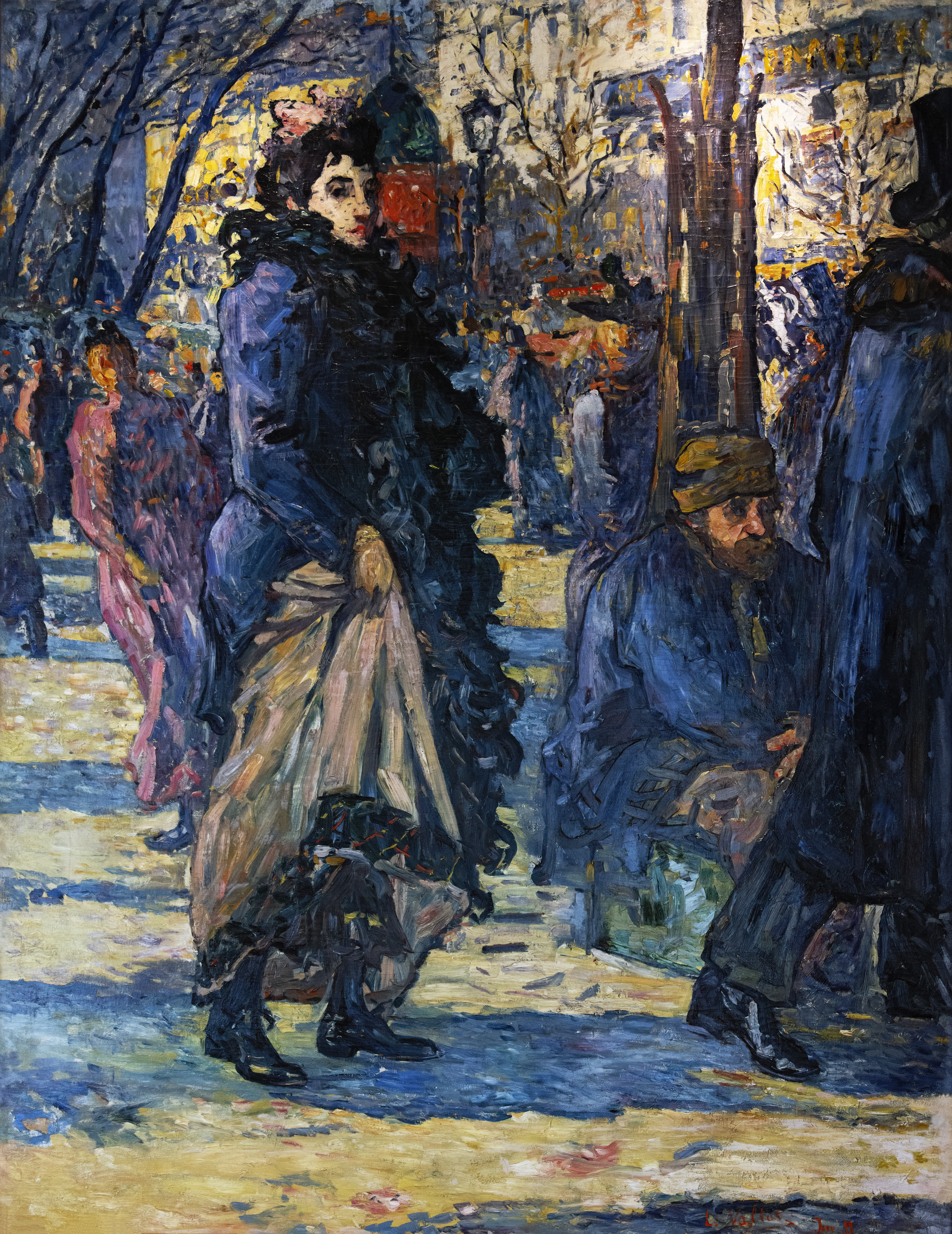
Sur le Boulevard (1893) Fondation Bemberg Toulouse

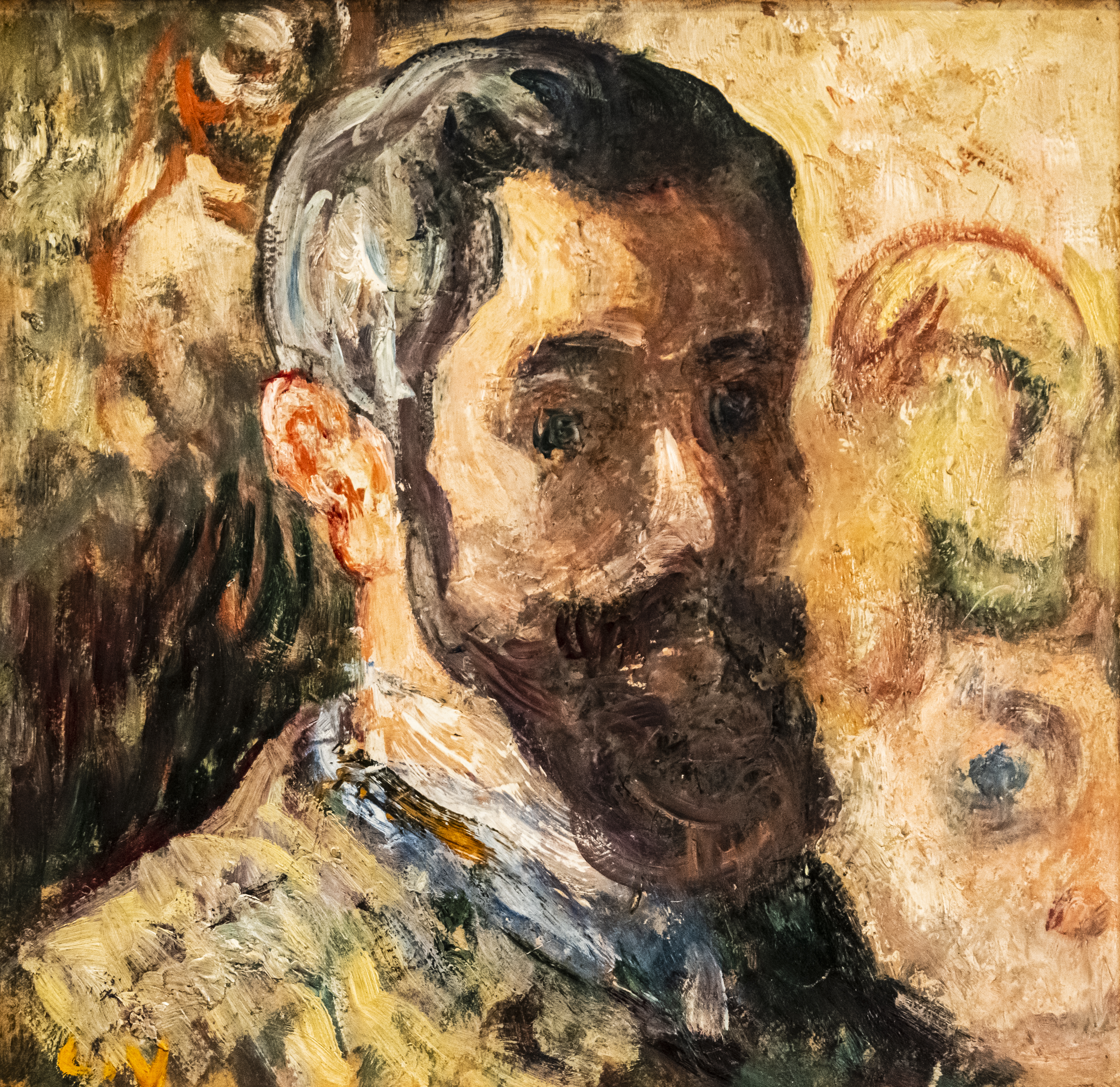
Louis Valtat - Self-Portrait (1900) Fondation Bemberg Toulouse

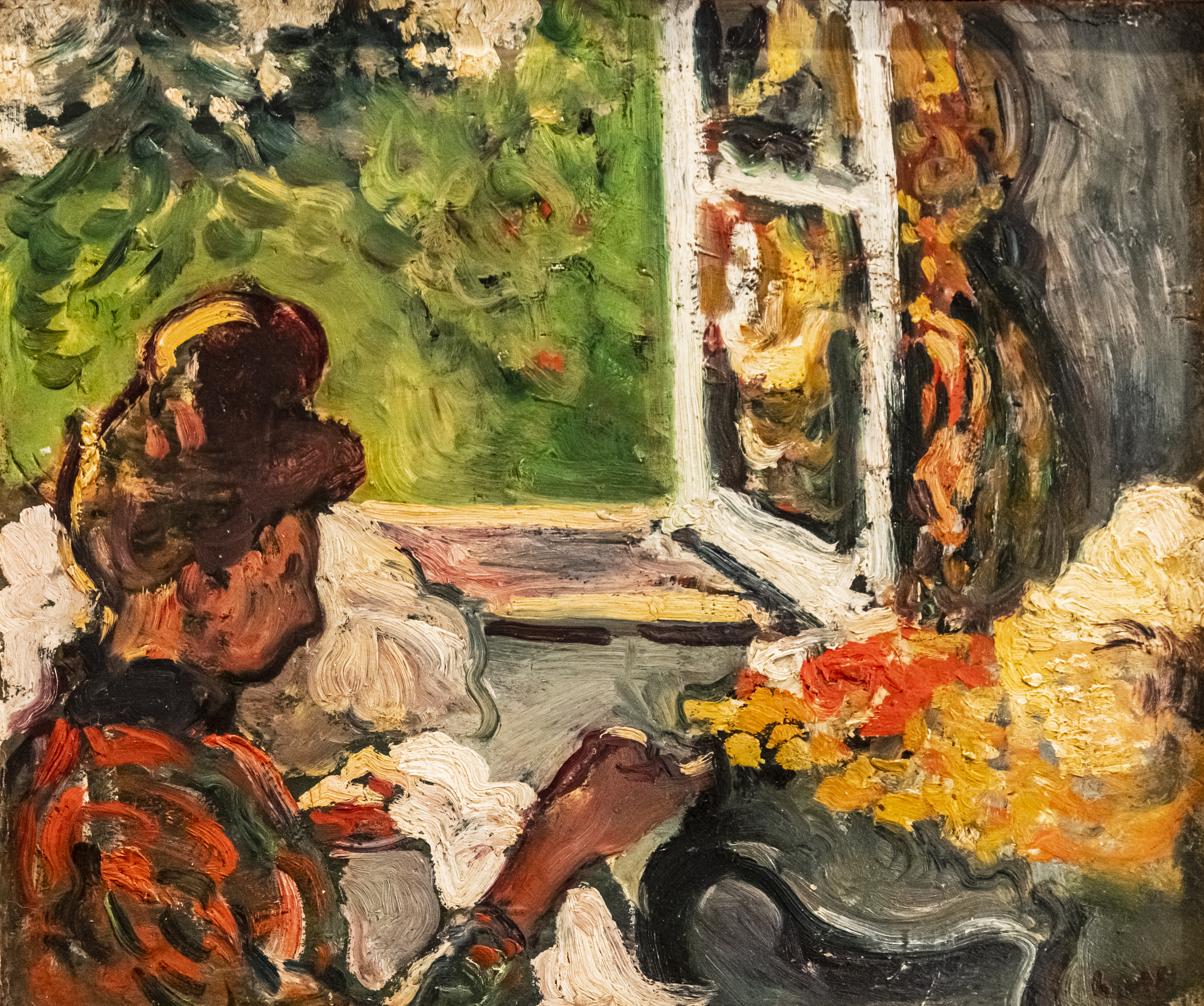
Femme assise près d'une fenêtre vers 1903. Collection Bemberg Toulouse

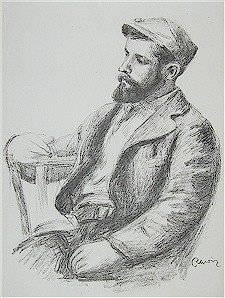
Portrait of Louis Valtat circa 1904 (age 35) by fellow painter Auguste Renoir
