= Musée Renoir =

Art museum in Cagnes-sur-Mer

Coordinates: 43°40′04″N 7°09′25″E

Musée Renoir de Cagnes-sur-Mer
- Domaine des Collettes
- Established: 1960 (66 years ago)
- Location: 19 Chemin des Collettes; 06800 Cagnes-sur-Mer, Alpes-Maritimes, France
- Type: Art museum
- Collection size: 11 original paintings, furniture, personal objects, photographs, drawings, lithographs and sculptures by Auguste Renoir; works by Pierre Renoir, Albert André, Aristide Maillol, Marcel Gimond, Richard Guino, Raoul Dufy, Pierre Bonnard and others
- Architect: Jules Febvre

The Musée Renoir is a museum in Cagnes-sur-Mer, France, dedicated to impressionist painter Auguste Renoir.

== History ==
After discovering Cagnes-sur-Mer in 1903, Auguste Renoir, who was suffering from health problems, finally settled there by purchasing the three-hectare Domaine des Collettes on 28 June 1907, after falling in love with its centuries-old olive grove, orange trees and 19th-century farmhouse. He would have preferred to live in the old rustic farmhouse (which houses the Association of Friends of the Musée Renoir), but as Madame Renoir wanted a spacious house, he had a Neo-Provençal-style residence with two artist's studios built in 1908 by the Nice architect Jules Febvre. He moved there in the autumn of 1908 and painted and sculpted there for eleven years with his wife Aline and their three children, Pierre, Jean and Claude, until his death on 3 December 1919 at the age of 78.

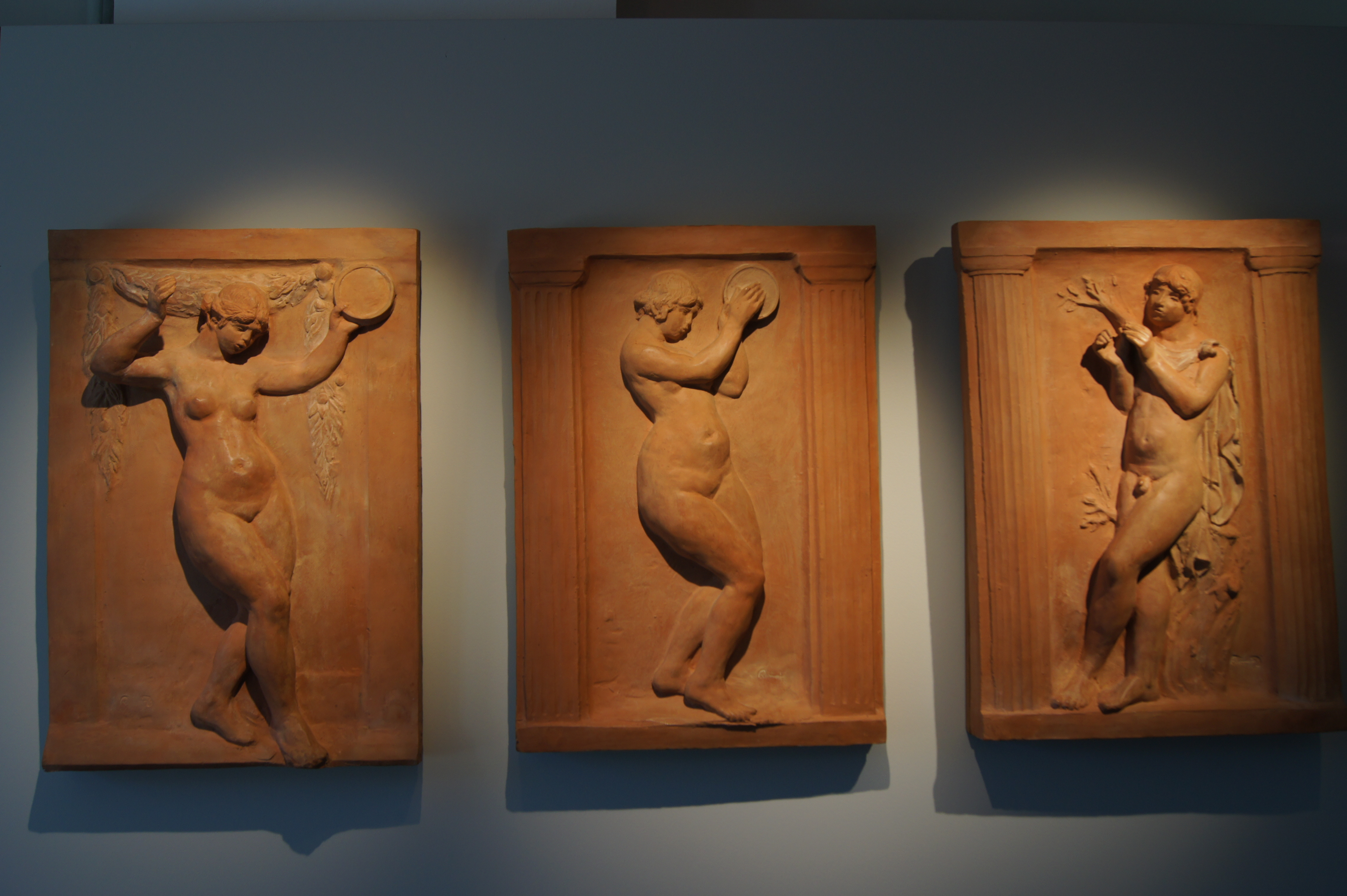
Renoir's bas-relief of dancers. Musée Renoir de Cagnes-sur-Mer.

At this residence, he produced works from his "Cagnes period" or "late period", drawing inspiration from his estate. He also turned to sculpture between 1913 and 1918, first with Richard Guino and later with Louis Morel. He received contemporary artists at his villa, including Henri Matisse, Aristide Maillol, Amedeo Modigliani, Auguste Rodin, Pablo Picasso, Claude Monet and others.

After his death, he left the estate to his son Claude Renoir, who lived there until 1960.

In 1959, the Domaine des Collettes served as a filming location for Le Déjeuner sur l'herbe, a film by Jean Renoir, who thus filmed in the house where he had spent his childhood.

In 1960, the city of Cagnes-sur-Mer purchased the estate to turn it into a museum with about a dozen rooms, "where everything has remained as it was". The park was opened to the public. Over time, the national museums enriched the museum's collections with works by Pierre Renoir, Albert André, Aristide Maillol, Marcel Gimond, Richard Guino, Raoul Dufy, Pierre Bonnard, Ferdinand Deconchy, among others.

From 31 January 2012 until July 2013, the estate and museum were closed to the public for a complete renovation, and the collection of the "Musée Renoir" was transferred in its entirety to the Château Grimaldi in Cagnes-sur-Mer. The museum has held the Maisons des Illustres ("Houses of the Illustrious") designation since June 2011.

=== Heritage protection ===
The villa was designated as a monument historique by decree on 25 October 2001.

== 2026 theft ==
On September 8, 2026, two thieves made off with four paintings just before six o'clock in the morning, but lost two of them during their escape through the museum garden. The stolen works were the Portrait of Madame Colonna Romano and Jeune Femme au puits. They were among the most valuable in the museum. Both stolen paintings were on loan from the Musée d'Orsay in Paris.

Jeune Femme au puits (c. 1886)

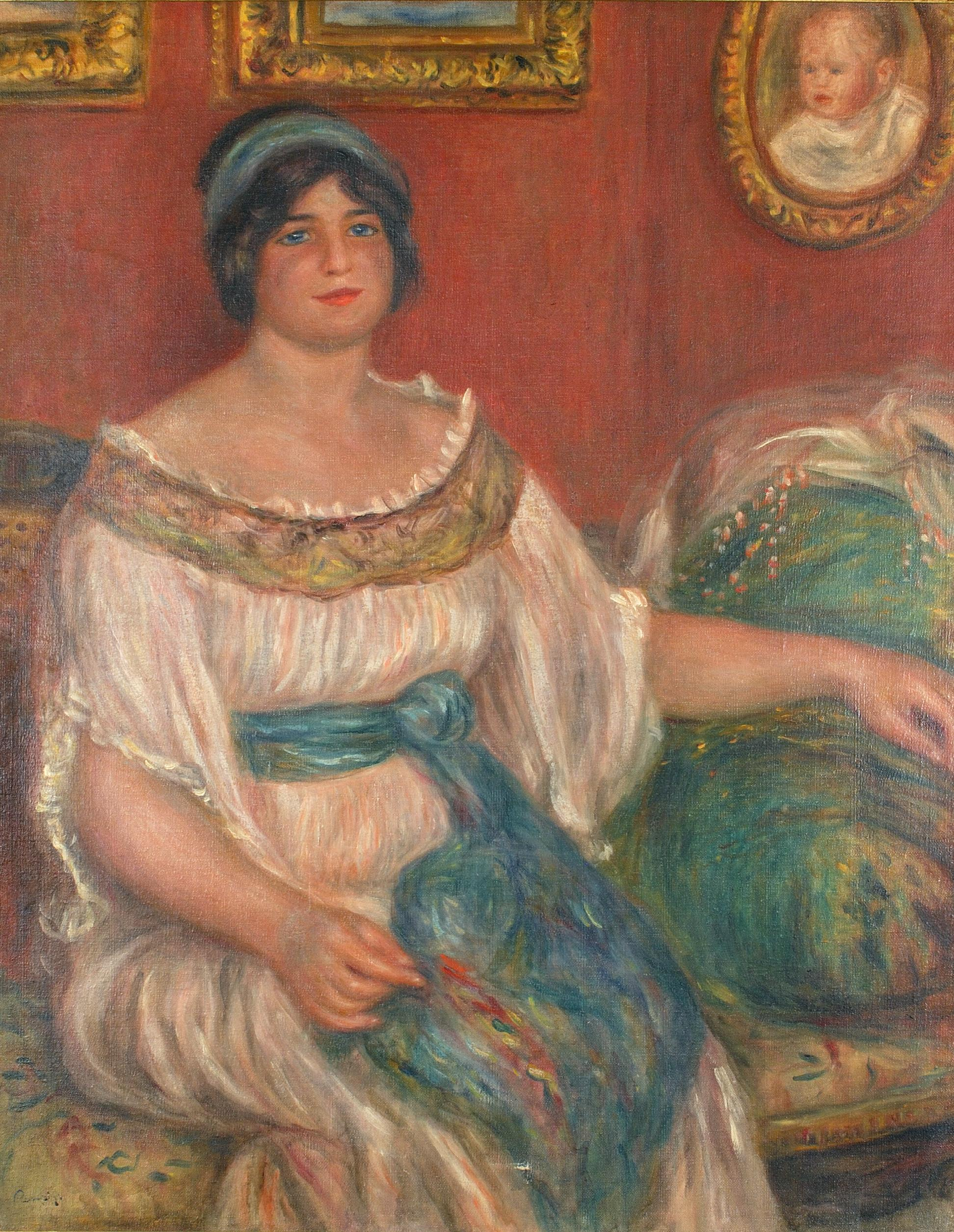
Portrait of Madame Colonna Romano (c. 1910)

== Collection ==
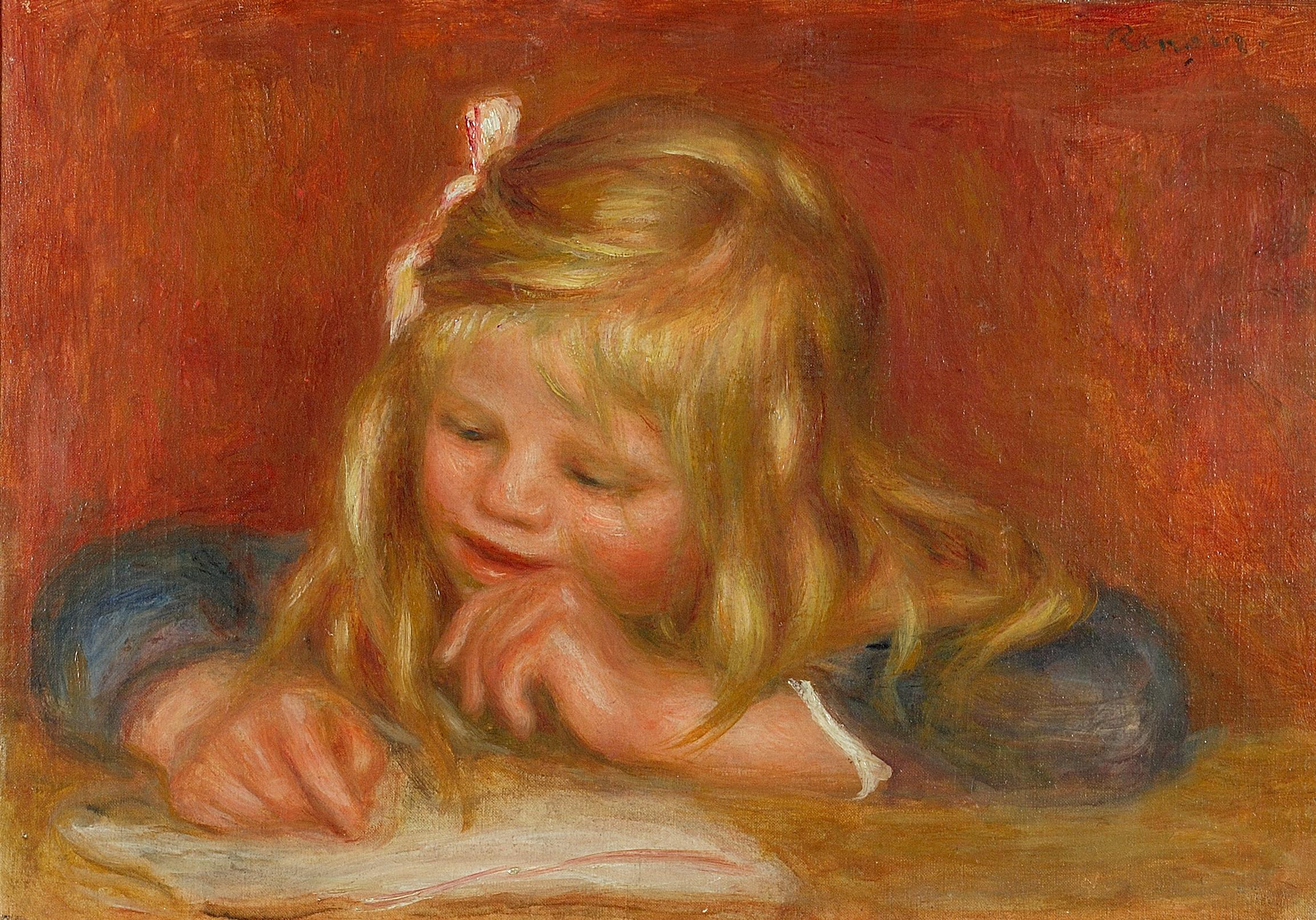
Coco lisant, 1905.

- Jeune Femme au puits, c. 1886
- Nu assis, 1895
- Portrait de madame Stephen Pichon, 1895
- Les Grandes Baigneuses, 1901–1902
- Coco lisant, 1905
- La Vallée de la Cagne et le baou de Saint-Jeannet, 1905
- Madame Colonna Romano, c. 1910
- Promenade, sous-bois, 1910
- Paysage aux Collettes, 1914
- La Ferme des Collettes, c. 1915
- Les Toits du Vieux-Nice, 1911–1919
- Petite Laveuse, c. 1915–1916
- Nature morte aux pommes et aux amandes, c. 1919

== See also ==
- List of art museums
- List of museums in France
- List of paintings by Pierre-Auguste Renoir
- List of single-artist museums
