= Jeune Femme au puits =

1886 painting by Pierre-Auguste Renoir

- Artist: Pierre-Auguste Renoir
- Year: c. 1886 (unfinished)
- Medium: Oil on wood
- Dimensions: 35 cm × 27 cm (14 in × 11 in)
- Condition: stolen
- Location: Musée Renoir, Cagnes-sur-Mer
- Website: musees.cagnes.fr

Jeune Femme au puits (English: Young Woman at the Well) is an oil painting by the French painter Pierre-Auguste Renoir, produced in about 1886. An unfinished work, it consists of a vertical portrait depicting a young woman standing near a well against a cream-coloured background. Seen in left-side profile, she raises her right arm to hold the rope to which a bucket resting on the well’s rim is attached, and reaches toward it with her other hand. The artist’s initials appear in the lower left corner of the composition.

After having been owned by Ambroise Vollard, the work was looted by Nazi Germany during World War II. Found in a private collection in 1949, it was recovered by the French government that same year. Added to the collections of the Musée d'Orsay in Paris, it was placed on loan to the Musée Renoir in Cagnes-sur-Mer, in the Alpes-Maritimes, in 1995.

The artwork was stolen on 8 September 2026 along with Portrait of Madame Colonna Romano, also by Renoir. Both were recovered a month later.
