= Hamlet (1908 film) =

1908 short silent film by Henri Desfontaines

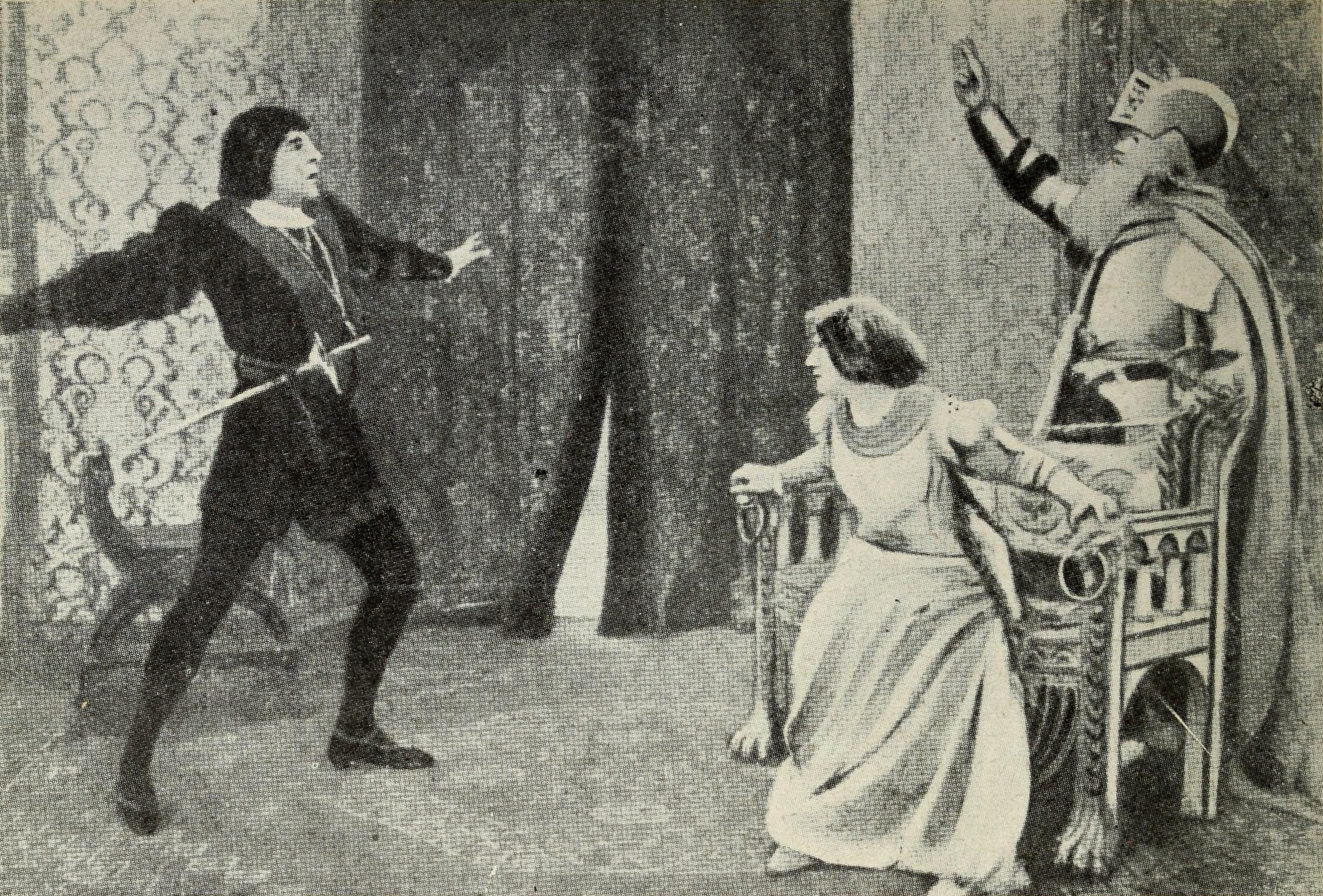
Hamlet. Jacques Grétillat, left, and Gabrielle Colonna-Romano, right.

Hamlet is a 1908 French silent film adaptation of the classic William Shakespeare play, Hamlet. The film was one of the earliest film adaptations of this play, and starred Jacques Grétillat and Colanna Romano. It was directed by Henri Desfontaines, and was one of twelve renditions of the play produced during the silent film era.

== Cast ==
- Jacques Grétillat as Hamlet
- Colanna Romano as Gertrude
- Claude Benedict
- Henri Desfontaines
