= Portrait of Madame Colonna Romano =

1913 painting by Pierre-Auguste Renoir

Madame Colonna Romano
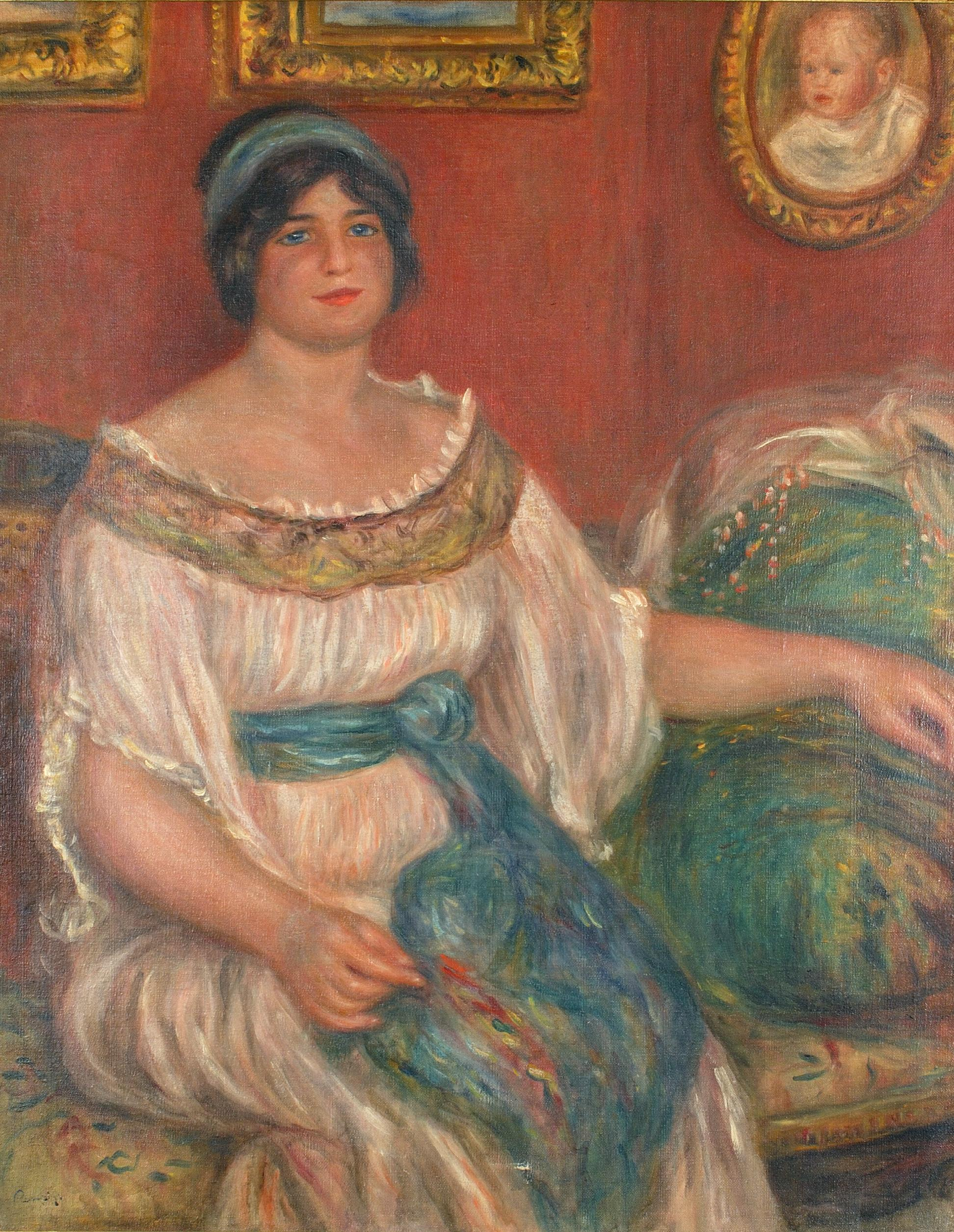
- Artist: Pierre-Auguste Renoir
- Year: c. 1913
- Medium: Oil on canvas
- Dimensions: 94 cm × 74 cm (37 in × 29 in)
- Condition: stolen
- Location: Musée Renoir, Cagnes-sur-Mer
- Website: musees.cagnes.fr

The Portrait of Madame Colonna Romano is an oil painting by the French painter Pierre-Auguste Renoir, produced in about 1913. The portrait depicts Gabrielle Colonna-Romano, a French actress.

The young woman wears a white dress, a blue headband in her black hair, and a blue belt. She sits on a sofa, resting her left hand on a green cushion, in a room with red walls adorned with paintings, and her gaze directed toward the viewer.

The work remained in the artist's possession until his death in 1919, when it was looted by Nazi Germany during World War II. After being deposited at the kunsthalle in Bremen, it was recovered by the French government following the war. Added to the collections of the Musée d'Orsay in Paris, it has been on loan to the Musée Renoir in Cagnes-sur-Mer, in the Alpes-Maritimes, since 1995.

Other paintings by Renoir depicting Colonna-Romano exist around the world, notably the Portrait of Colonna Romano at the Musée des Beaux-Arts in Limoges, his hometown in Haute-Vienne.

The artwork was stolen on 8 September 2026 along with Jeune Femme au puits, also painted by Renoir. Both were recovered a month later.

== Other paintings of Colonna Romano ==
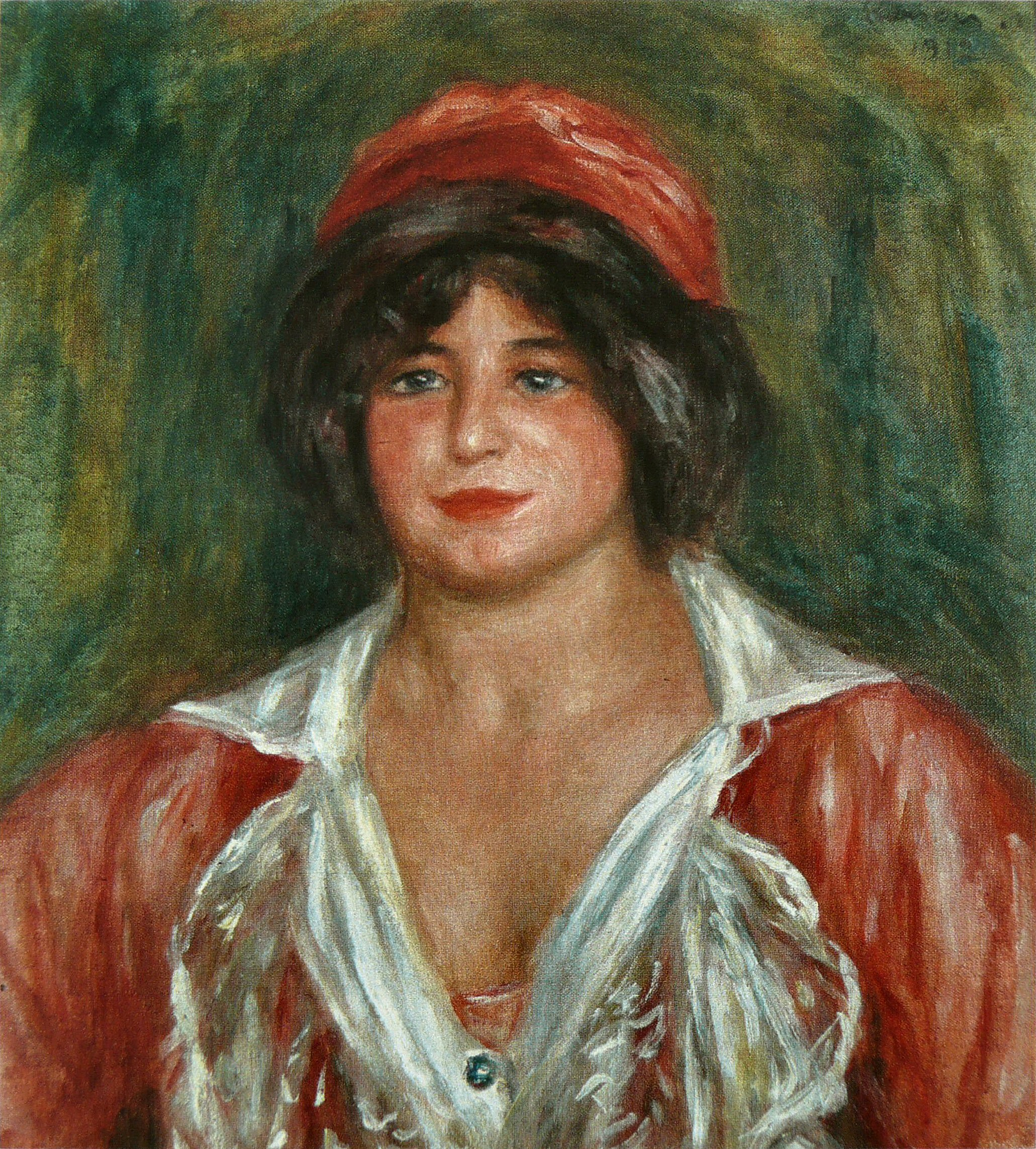
Portrait de Colonna Romano, 1912 – Musée des Beaux-Arts de Limoges, Limoges.

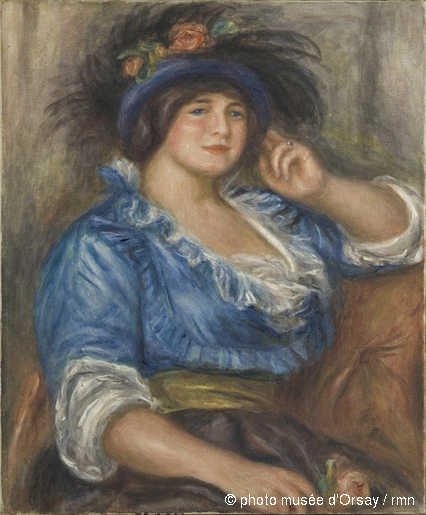
Jeune femme à la rose, c. 1913 – Musée d'Orsay, Paris.
