= Richard Guino =

French sculptor

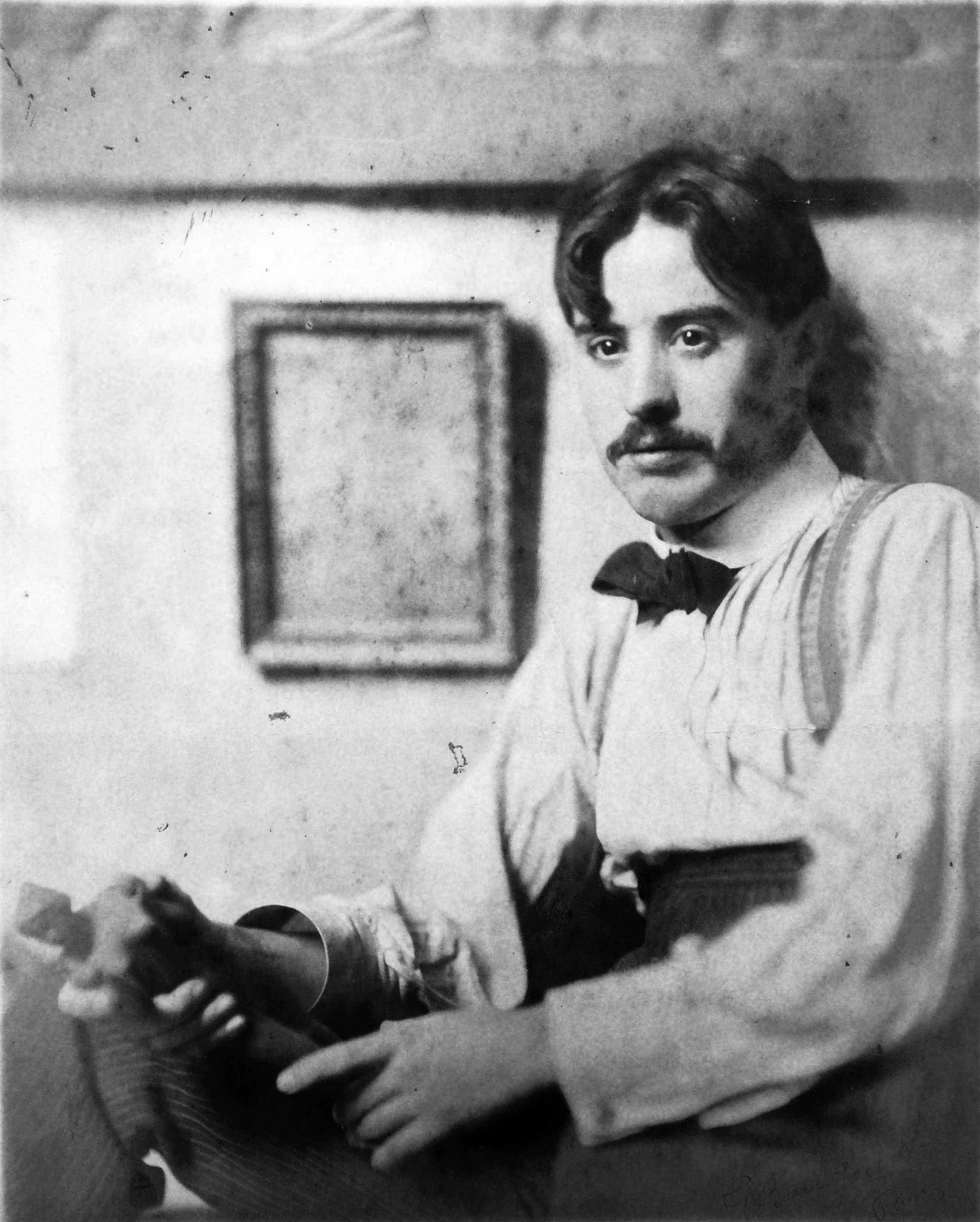
Ricardo Guino in his studio, in the early 1910s in Paris, by his photographer friend Gervais Bougourd

Richard Guino (in Catalan Ricard Guinó i Boix; May 26, 1890 – February 1973) was a French sculptor of Catalan origin.

His work is an ode to femininity which revives the Mediterranean ideal of beauty. Richard Guino brings about a synthesis full of sensuality between classicism and modernity, using a great variety of techniques and materials – wood, wax, marble, bronzes, terracottas, plasters, ivories, glass, ceramics, majolicas, drawings and paintings. His fruitful collaboration with Pierre-Auguste Renoir constitutes a rare episode in the history of Art.

== Origins and Catalan youth ==
Richard Guino was born on May 26, 1890, in Girona, Catalonia, Spain, the son of an ebony cabinet maker. His parents sent him to school in a Marist college where he underwent an extremely rigid education. A precocious sculptor, he entered the Art School of Girona at a very young age and left in 1906 to follow the courses of the Superior School of Fine Arts in Barcelona – Pablo Picasso's father was one of his teachers. He participated in collective exhibitions in Girona (1908) and Barcelona (1910) where Aristide Maillol, 30 years his elder, discovered him. Considering him "the most gifted European sculptor of his generation", Maillol asked him to join him in France to work at his side.

== Paris ==
Guino settled in Paris in 1910, in a studio located in Rue Daguerre in the Montparnasse neighborhood, and he assisted Maillol in his studios in Paris and Marly-le-Roi. He attended the Ranson Academy in Montmartre where he met Maurice Denis, for whom he realized notably a few low reliefs for the Théâtre des Champs-Élysées. He exhibited at the Société des Artistes Decorateurs, at the Société Nationale des Beaux-Arts, at the Galerie Druet and at the Galerie Marseille and Vildrac. Harry Graf Kessler and Art dealer Ambroise Vollard purchased his works. His drawings also were exhibited, he realized striking inks of Isadora Duncan dancing, sketched from life. He worked mainly on feminine figures, supple and powerful: Torso with drapery, Woman bather squatting, The Egyptian woman, Woman with mandolin and others.

== The Renoir-Guino sculptured work ==
It was around that time and at the request of Vollard that Maillol attempted to sculpt with Renoir. The old Master, urged on by Vollard, wished to explore sculpting. Handicapped by rheumatoid arthritis, he continued to paint, brushes slipped between his paralysed fingers, protected by narrow bandages. The dealer, who was admiring a medallion the painter had made of his youngest son Claude, took into his head to “find him a pair of hands”. Now Maillol was an accomplished artist, he could only do "Maillol" so... he presented Guino. Vollard, enthusiastic, arranged for him to meet with Renoir in 1913 and hired him at his own expense. An adventure began then between the young sculptor and the old painter, qualified as "miraculous" because of the communion of spirit and sensitivity which developed between the two artists. This collaboration lasted until 1918, in Essoyes first then at the “Collettes”, Renoir's villa in Cagnes-sur-Mer in Provence. This resulted in the creation of an ensemble of pieces considered at the zenith of modern sculpture: the Small Venus, the Venus victrix, the Judgement of Pâris, and the Large Washer Woman. When Renoir died in 1919, the sculptures were publicised and exploited as his alone by Vollard then by Renoir.

== Sculptor, ceramist, sketcher artist and painter ==
Guino, whom his libertarian sense kept away from any spirit of claiming, pursued his personal work. After his five years of collaboration with Renoir, intimately wounded by this denial of his creative share which commercial reasons motivated, attempted to reinvent himself, to change his style, exploring new techniques, in parallel to his sculptured work. He signed a contract with the Galerie Hebrard in Paris, which devoted three large personal exhibitions to him in 1919, 1922 and 1923. Interested in decorative arts, he realized numerous glazed ceramics and a few pieces of furniture. A long collaboration began in 1922 with the factory of Sèvres which for more than ten years rendered editions of his models in stoneware and bisque.

In 1923, he participated in the spring exhibition of Barcelona, exhibited paintings and drawings at the Galerie Devauchez and some pieces at the Musée Galliera, at the Salon des Tuileries and at the Salon de la des Artistes Décorateurs. In 1924 he exhibited at the Musée des Arts Décoratifs which acquired Woman with Tambourine. His drawings were exhibited at the Maison Barbedienne, his sculptures at the Salon de la Societé des Artistes Décorateurs. He signed a contract with the editing house Colin which for ten years would edit bronzes from his models. In 1925, Guino attended the International Exhibition of Decorative Arts of Paris where he obtained honorary diplomas for metal and ceramics. He also participated in the exhibition of contemporary French Art in Japan.

That same year, he obtained French citizenship and married Gabrielle Borzeix; together they went on to have six children: Georges, Claude, Evelyne, artistes Michel Guino, a sculptor, Marie Guino-Ronchi, a painter, and Jean Borzeix, who died prematurely. Guino settled with his large family in a bigger studio in Antony, outside of Paris, next to his friend and photographer Bougourd, who was part of the joyful band of artists who lent life to Rue Daguerre.

In 1928, he entered the XIth competition of the Musée Galliera, bronze section. In 1929, exhibitions at the Galerie Hector Brame of drawings and small plates for book binding, at the Salon des Indépendants and at the Salon de la Société des Artistes Français (Salons of 1930, 1931, 1932, 1933 and 1934). In 1931, he exhibited again at the Salon des Indépendants and signed a contract with the editing house Susse frères, with which he would collaborate until 1955.

== The Renoir-Guino sculptured work II ==
The “enigma of the Renoir sculpture” was not solved until sixty years after its creation, at the end of a long action initiated in 1965 by Michel Guino, son of Richard Guino and himself a sculptor, who laboured to divulge his father's sculpture. After a close analysis of the pieces, of the processes which directed their creation and after the hearing of numerous artists, Richard Guino was recognized co-author in 1971 by the Third Civil Court of the Tribunal de Paris and the issue was settled by the Supreme Court of Appeal in 1973. The art historian Paul Haesaerts specified as early as 1947 in his book Renoir sculptor (Ed. Hermes, Bruxelles): “Guino was never an actor merely reading his text or a musician interpreting mechanically his score. The latter content themselves with being performers, in no way do they participate in the creative process. Guino was involved body and soul in the creative act. We can even affirm that if he hadn't been there, the sculpture of Renoir would have never seen the light. Guino was indispensable.”

The action was not entered against Renoir, a twist which was conveyed in numerous texts and newspaper articles referring to the case. The goal of the lawsuit was to unveil the exceptional account of this process of creation and to bring to light the original contribution of Guino to the sculptured work, initially obscured by Vollard. A sculptor's “assistant” reproduces or enlarges an already existing model. Guino on the other hand, did a transposition of techniques: we pass from the painting of Renoir to the sculpture of Guino, the spirit of the painting will manifest in the spirit of the sculpture. Transmutation confirmed between two artists. This phenomenon was able to take place thanks to their friendship and intense commonality of vision. The painter at his canvas, on the first floor of the villa and the sculptor shaping the clay in his studio of the garden of the “Collettes”. And it is this unique and rare point which characterizes this work of art.

== Exhibitions ==
Upon his death, Richard Guino's studio contained more than 200 sculptures (wood, bronzes, terra cottas, plasters, ivories, glasses), numerous ceramics and majolicas, more than 200 paintings (portraits, landscapes, still lifes) and 3000 drawings (watercolors, gouaches, wash drawings, engravings, lithographs, monotypes, drawings in red chalk, charcoal drawings )... His numerous erotic drawings, recently disclosed, bring to light the dionysiac aspect of this artist of uncommon destiny.

- Renoir-Guino. Sculptures et dessins, Hôtel Le Bristol Paris, 1974
- Richard Guino, Paskine de Ginoux Strasbourg, 1976
- Rétrospective Richard Guino, sculptures, dessins, Maison de Renoir aux Collettes, Cagnes-sur-Mer, 1977
- Sculptures Renoir-Guino et Guino, Tokyo, 1989
- Ricard Guino Escultures i dibuixos, Ajuntament de Girona, Espagne, 1992
- Renoir-Guino Musée Océanographique de Monaco en octobre 1994, à Bruges en Belgique en juillet 1995, à Cannes et à Monaco en juillet-août 1996, à Busto Arcizio au Museo delle Arti Palazzo Bandera en mai-juin 1997
- Biennale de Shanghai, première édition, 2003
- L’érotisme dans l’œuvre de Richard Guino, Louvre des Antiquaires, Paris 2006

The Renoir-Guino sculptures are exhibited in great museums: Musée d'Orsay Paris, Tate Gallery London, Museum of Modern Art New York, Contemporary Sculpture Center Tokyo, etc.

Since 1992, the museum of Girona (Spain), his native town, proposes a permanent exhibition of works of Richard Guino. An ensemble of pieces can be seen in Antony, outside Paris in his old studio.
