= Electric knife =

Motorized kitchen tool

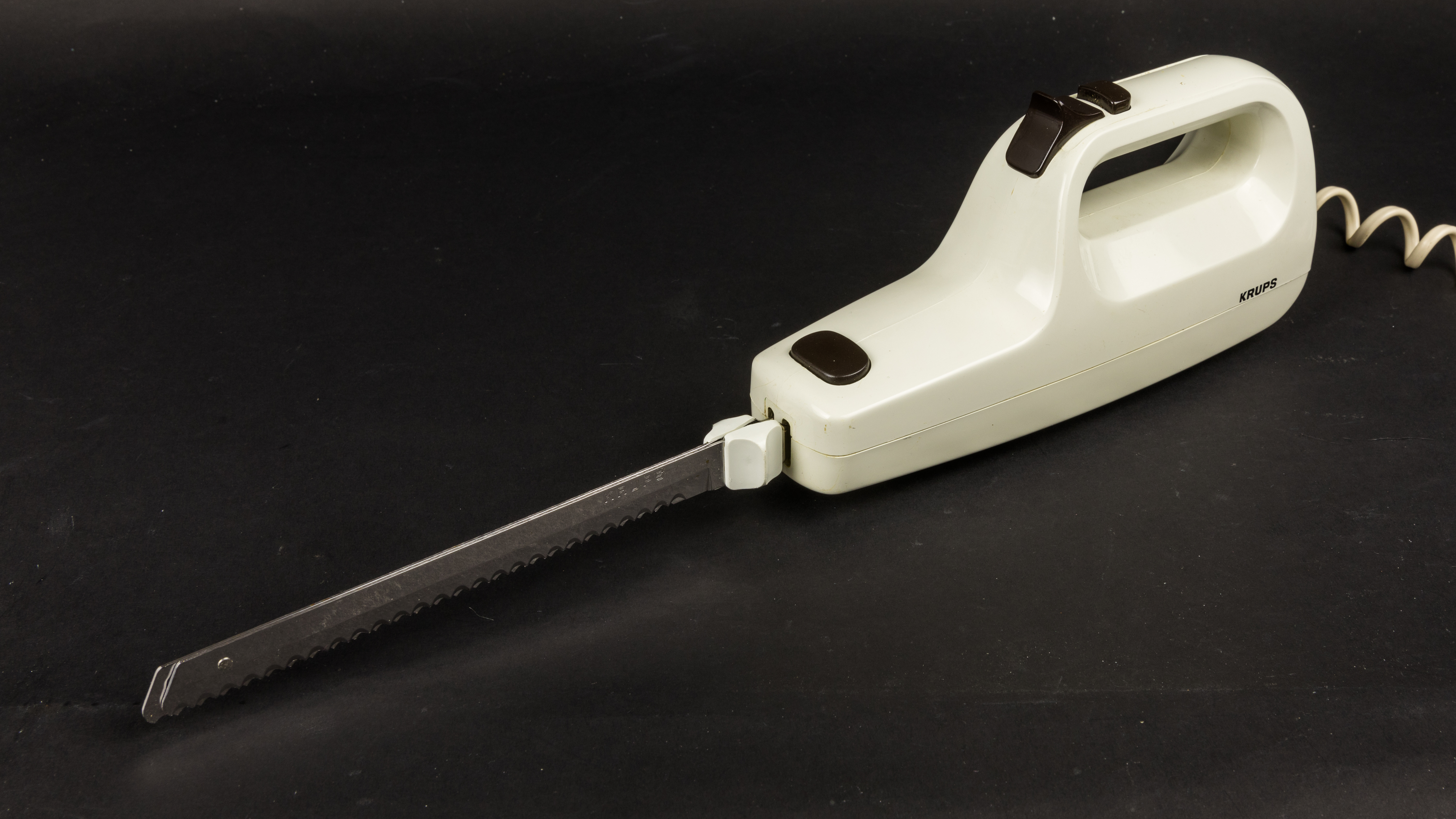
An electric carving knife

Slicing a meatloaf with an electric knife from Krups

An electric carving knife or electric knife is an electrical kitchen device used for slicing foods. The device consists of two serrated blades that are clipped together. When the appliance is switched on, the blades continuously move lengthways to provide the sawing action. They were popular in the United Kingdom in the 1970s.

== Invention ==
The invention of the electric knife is usually attributed to Jerome L. Murray, but there are other claimants, such as Clem E. Kosterman, who filed a patent in 1939.

Electric knives can be corded or cordless.

== Other uses ==
They are also sometimes used for other purposes, including sculpting polyurethane foam rubber, cutting wood, cutting metal, and other solid or semi-solid substances and materials.

== See also ==
- Hedge trimmer
- Reciprocating saw
