= Albert André =

French painter

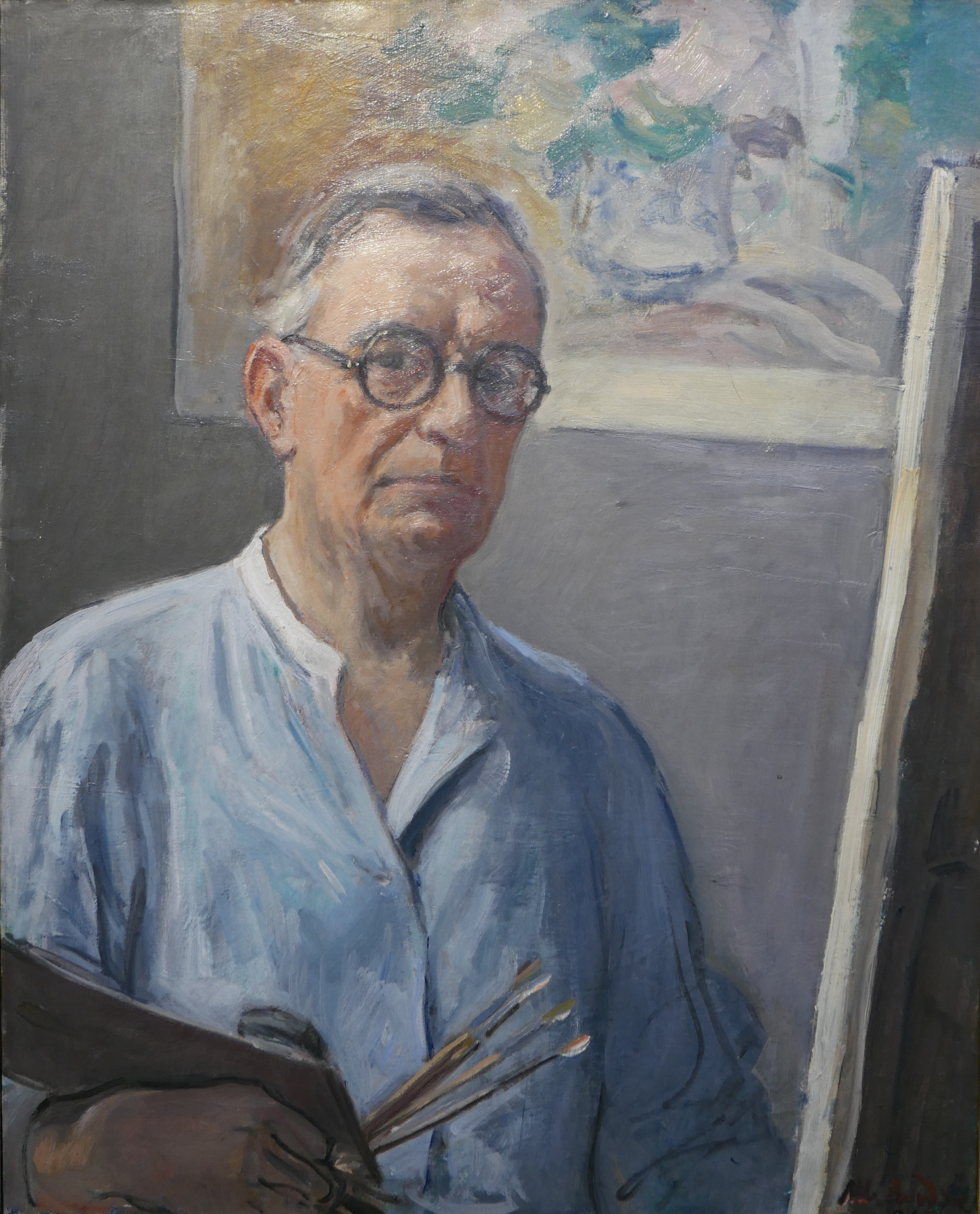
- Self-portrait with palette in 1936 from museum in Bagnols-sur-Cèze, France
- Born: 24 May 1869; Lyon, France
- Died: 11 July 1954 (aged 85)

Albert André (24 May 1869 – 11 July 1954) was a French Post-Impressionist figurative painter. He produced portraits of Pierre-Auguste Renoir, his closest friend, and Claude Monet.

== Biography ==
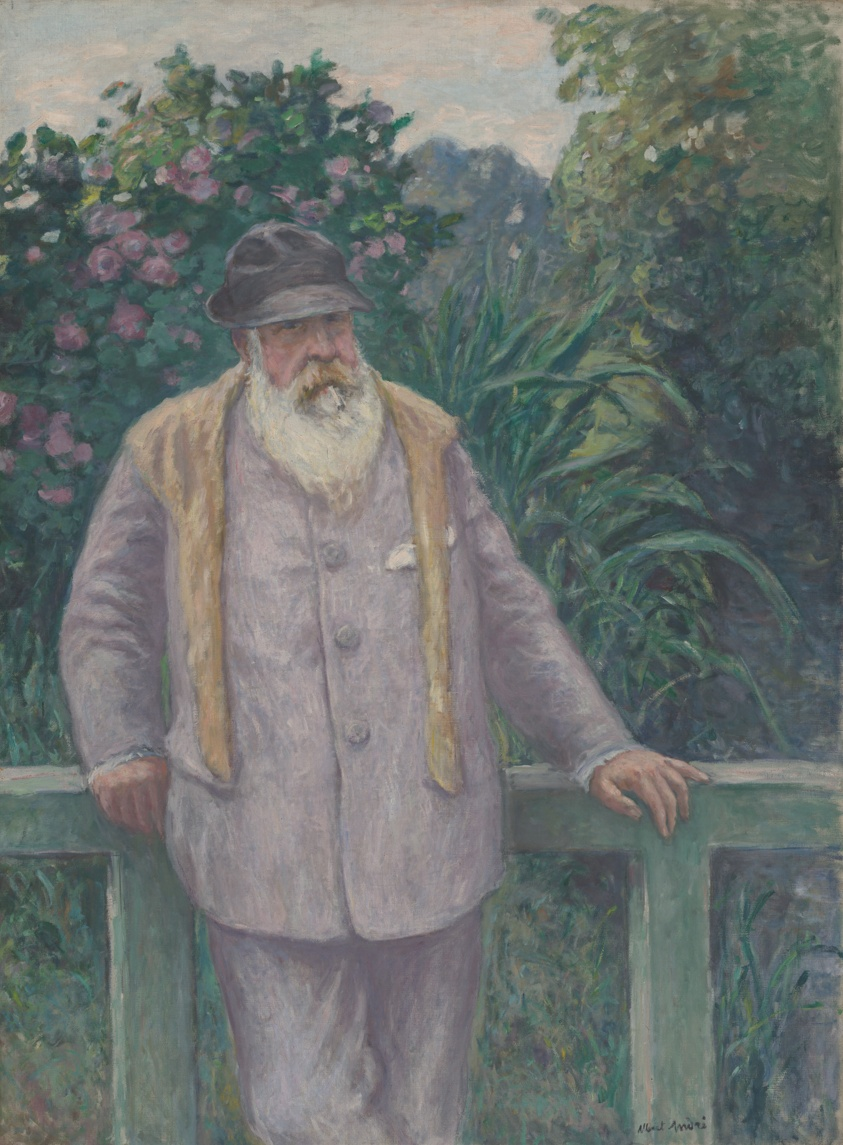
Portrait of Claude Monet by André (1922)

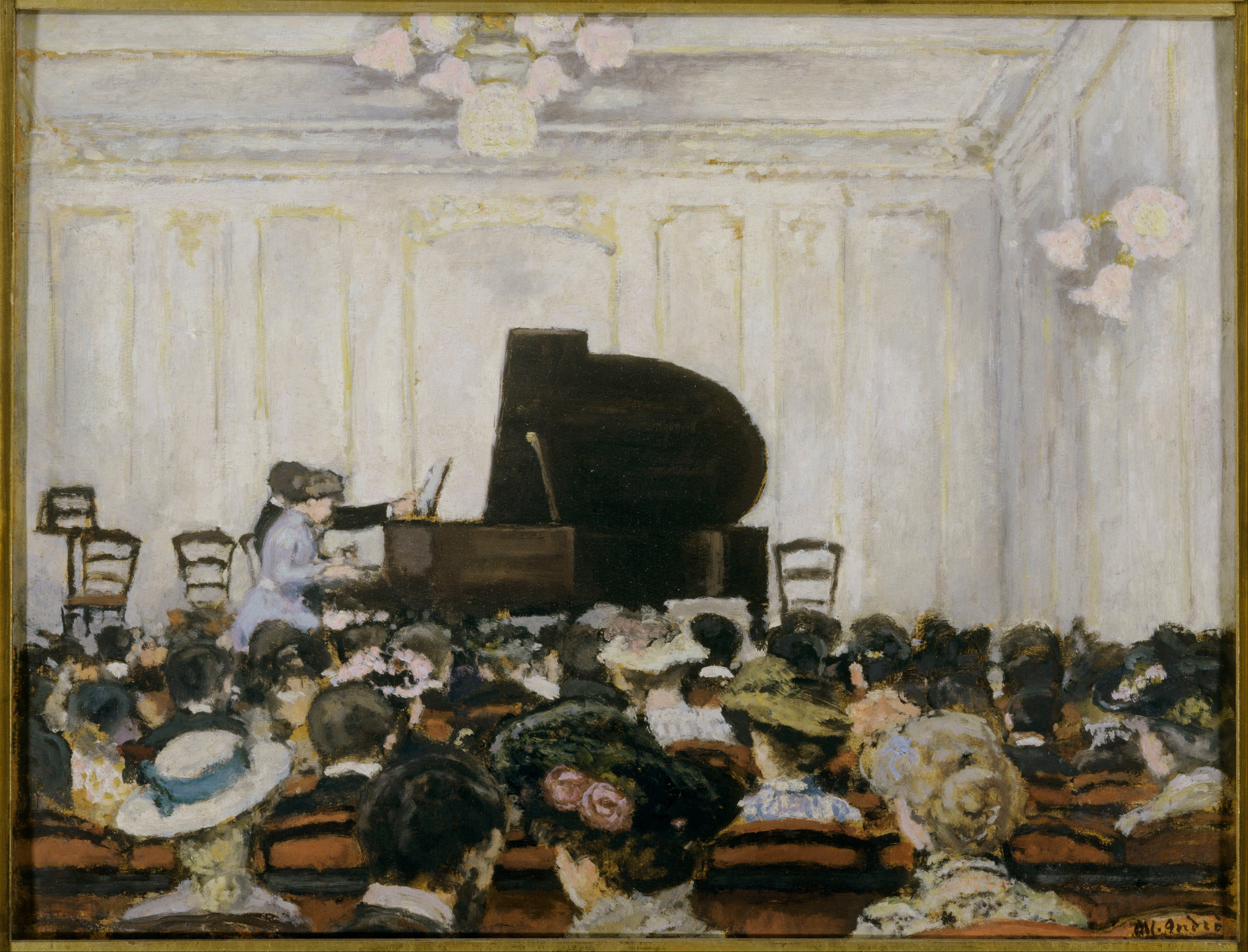
The Concert, 1903

Born in Lyon, he initially trained there designing patterns for silk. In 1889 he moved to Paris to enroll at the Académie Julian. There he met Paul Ranson, Louis Valtat, and Georges d'Espagnat. He also associated with the group known as Les Nabis which included Bonnard, Vuillard, Denis, Vallotton, Marquet and Signac.

In 1894, he exhibited five paintings at the Salon des Indépendants where he caught the eye of Renoir. Despite their age difference, a solid friendship united them until Renoir's death in 1919, providing André with guidance in his career. Through Renoir's art dealer, Paul Durand-Ruel, André was able to sell many of his paintings in the United States through the Durand-Ruel Galleries. Between 1895 and 1901, he exhibited at the Salon des Cent, the Salon des Indépendants, the Exposition d'Art Nouveau, the Salon d'Automne, and, in 1904, at the Salon de la Libre Esthétique in Brussels. In 1912, Durand-Ruel enabled André to exhibit his work in New York City and in 1913, he was selected to celebrate the twentieth anniversary of the Libre Esthétique in Brussels, showcasing works on a theme of southern France. He would later showcase his works many times in New York City, as in 1930.

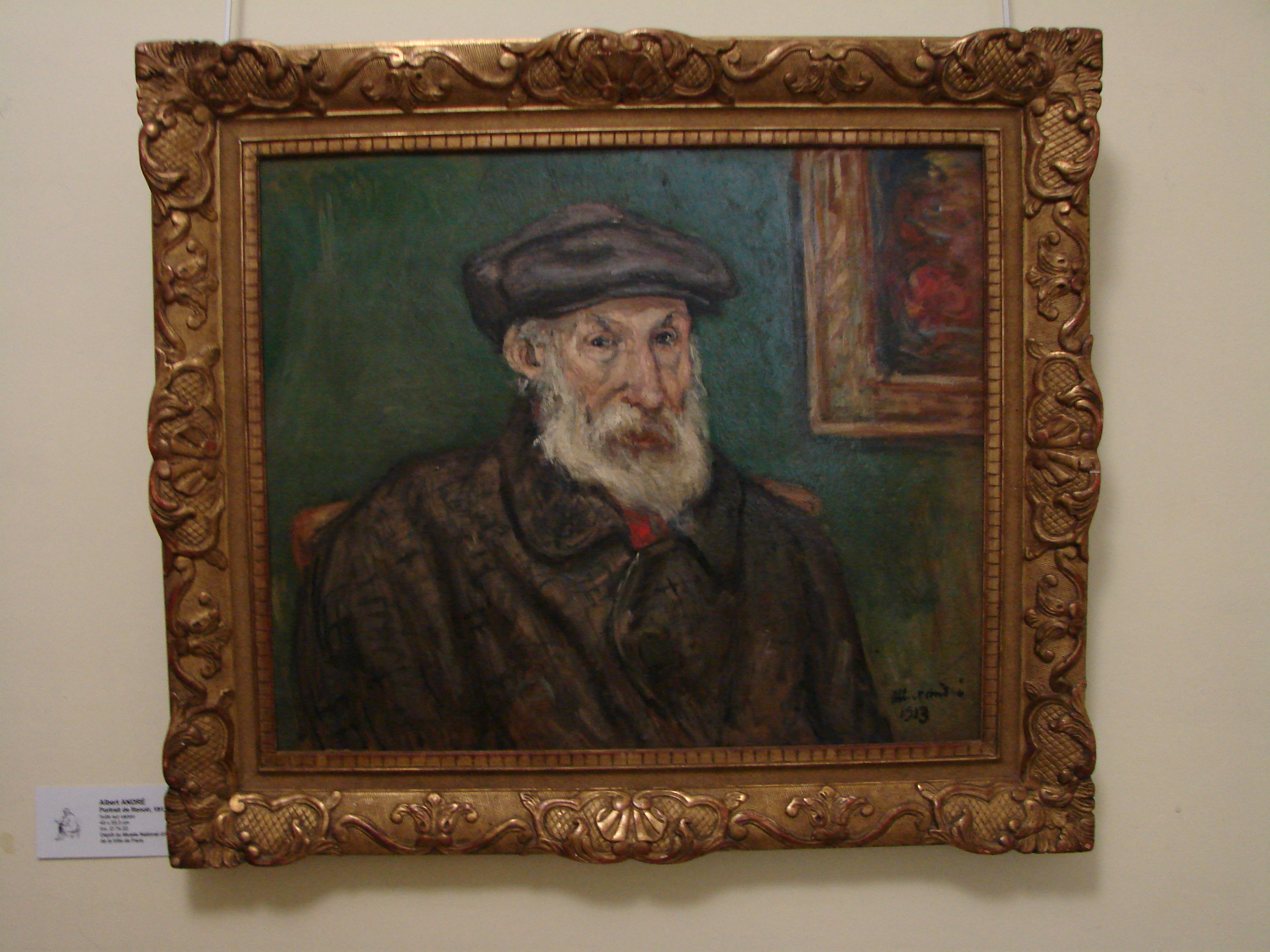
Portrait of Renoir by Albert André (1913)

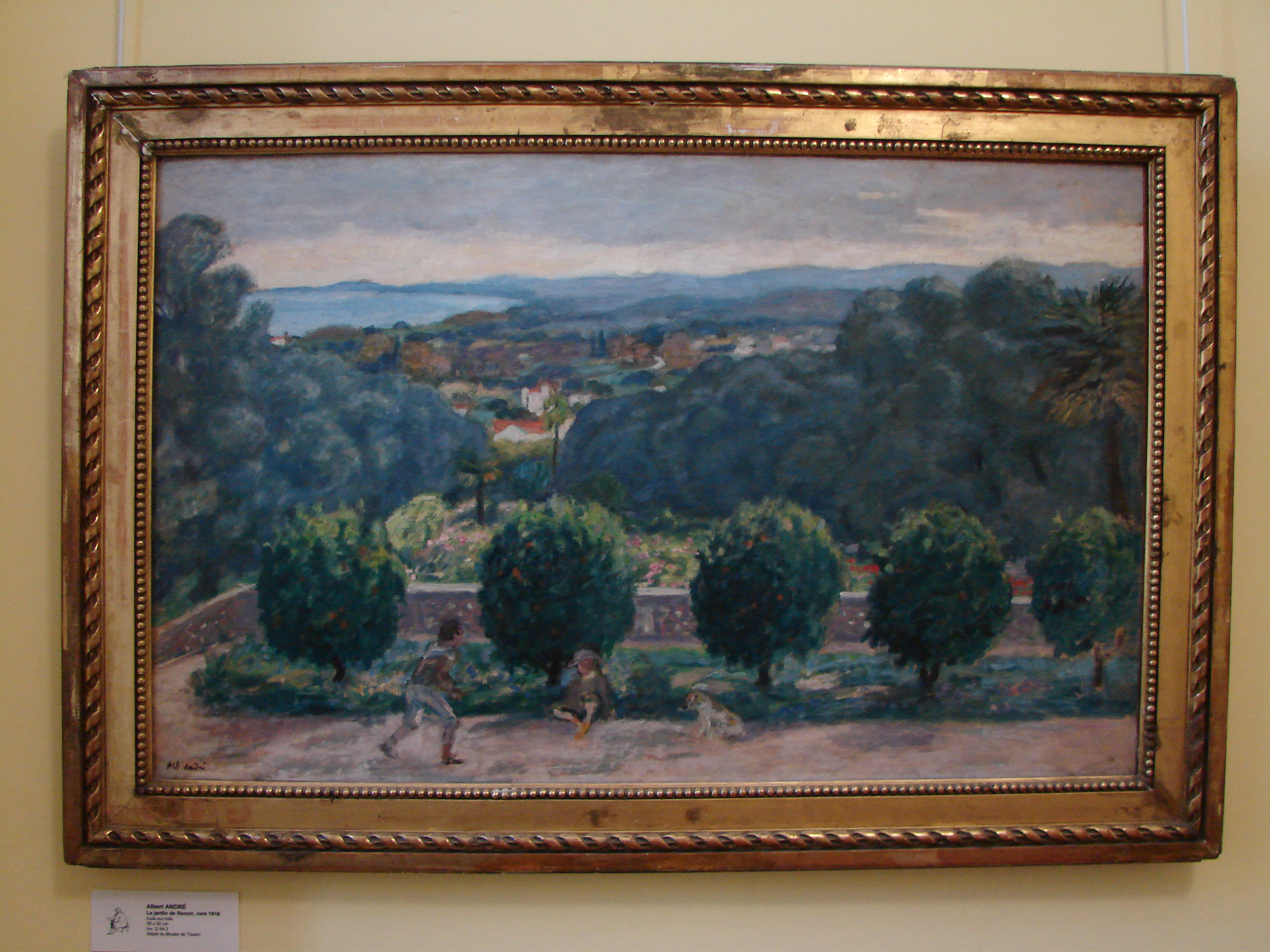
Albert André: Renoir's garden in Cagnes-sur-Mer

Demobilized from World War I in 1917, he moved to Marseille and then to the village of Laudun in the Gard, where he had been on vacation since his childhood as his family owned a house there together with a small vineyard. He became curator of the art museum of Bagnols-sur-Cèze, where he remained until his death. In 1919, he produced a monograph, "Renoir", considered to be "one of the most accurate contemporary accounts of the artist's work", and in 1921, he organized a retrospective of Renoir's work at the Durand-Ruel Gallery. He was also very close to the art critic George Besson, a friend since 1910. In 1971, Besson decided to offer his art collection to the nation, bequeathing to the museums of Besançon and Bagnols-sur-Cèze, where the museum is now called Musée Albert-André.

André died on 11 July 1954 at 85 years old, shortly before his works were due to be showcased at the Avignon Museum. After his death, in 1955, the Salon d’Automne organized a retrospective of his works. Today many of his paintings are to be found in major world museums such as the Modern Art Museum of New York, the Art Institute of Chicago, museums in Philadelphia and Washington DC, Paris's Musée d'Orsay, the Galerie Rienzo, and the Musée Albert-André in France.
