= The Knight of the Snows =

- Directed by: Georges Méliès
- Written by: Georges Méliès
- Cinematography: Georgette Méliès
- Production company: Star Film Company
- Distributed by: Pathé Frères
- Release date: February 21, 1913 (France)
- Running time: 400 meters
- Country: France
- Language: Silent

Le Chevalier des Neiges, known in English as The Knight of the Snows or The Knight of the Snow, is a 1912 French silent trick film directed by Georges Méliès.

== Plot ==
Princess Azurine, daughter of King Majolic, is betrothed to the handsome young Baron Gauthier, the Knight of the Snows. Just as the royal court is celebrating the betrothal, they are interrupted by Baron Hughes le Cruel, a pretender to the throne, who demands the hand of Azurine. The two barons fight briefly before Hughes leaves to consult a sorcerer, Alcofrisbas, who brings him in contact with demonic forces, including the Devil himself, Belphégor. Hughes, selling his soul to Belphégor, arranges to have Azurine kidnapped by demons and imprisoned. Belphégor and his attendant demons, with the help of a dragon-drawn flying carriage, carry out the kidnapping and lock Azurine in a distant dungeon.

Gauthier, determined to save Azurine, consults the sorcerer. The impartial Alcofrisbas puts him in contact with supernatural forces of good, who provide him with a magic rose to protect him, as well as a journey by ship to the dungeon. Using his wits and supernatural help, Gauthier manages to find Azurine and rescue her, bringing her back to Majolic's court amid much rejoicing. Hughes is about to be hung for his treachery when Belphégor appears and, reminding him that his soul has already been sold, drags him down directly to the Underworld.

== Production ==
The film was made by Méliès in the autumn of 1912; its initial working title was La Fée Carabosse, which Méliès had previously used as the French title of a 1906 film, known in English as The Witch. Méliès himself plays Belphégor, and a surviving scenario records the names of all the main characters: Baron Gauthier (the Knight of the Snows), Baron Hugues le Cruel (the man dressed in black, a pretender to the throne), Azurine daughter of King Majolic (the princess), Alcofrisbas (the sorcerer), and Belphégor (the Devil).

The Knight of the Snows, Méliès's penultimate film, was the last one he completed in 1912; production of The Voyage of the Bourrichon Family began in that year, but appears to have been interrupted after only a few scenes were filmed. The film is also the last Méliès made in the féerie style, his last film with Faustian themes, and the last of many films in which Méliès appeared as the Devil. The themes and effects in the film recall many from the previous Méliès films The Kingdom of the Fairies and The Palace of the Arabian Nights. Méliès had previously used the name Azurine, the kidnapped princess in the film, for the kidnapped princess in The Kingdom of the Fairies. In addition, many props and scenic elements were reused from other Méliès films, including the dragon puppet from The Witch and the mechanical snake from Rip's Dream.

Like the other five of Méliès's last films, The Knight of the Snows was made under contract with the Pathé Frères studio. Two Pathé cameras were used simultaneously to record these films, one of them likely handled by Méliès's daughter Georgette, who had been operating cameras for him since 1902. The abruptly linear continuity editing techniques in the film were common by 1912, but are markedly different from Méliès's usual cutting style, strongly implying that the film was completely recut by the Pathé director Ferdinand Zecca before release. The film is paced more slowly than Méliès's earlier works, with more supernumeraries and more time spent justifying magical effects and stage machinery. Méliès's film Cinderella or the Glass Slipper, made the same year, has a similar pace and similar evidence of recutting by Zecca.

Apart from these concessions to Pathé, the film is made in the theatrical style Méliès had continuously used for his fiction films since the 1890s, with action presented mostly in series of theatrical tableaux. Special effects in the film were created with stage machinery, pyrotechnics, substitution splices, superimpositions, and dissolves.

== Release and reception ==
The film, advertised by Pathé Frères as a féerie fantastique enfantine, was announced in Ciné-Journal on 8 February 1913, and ran at the Omnia Pathé cinema in Paris from the 21st to the 27th of the month.

Jack Zipes, in a description of the film, notes that "Méliès appears to have run out of steam and joy in this last twenty-minute féerie. There are very few comic touches … Nevertheless, [it] is a tightly-knit fairy-tale film that shows Méliès as a nimble master." Zipes adds that the film may have autobiographical overtones, with the individualistic innovator Méliès attempting to defend his style from "the dark forces of corporate filmmaking."
