= Henri Desfontaines =

French film director, actor, and scriptwriter

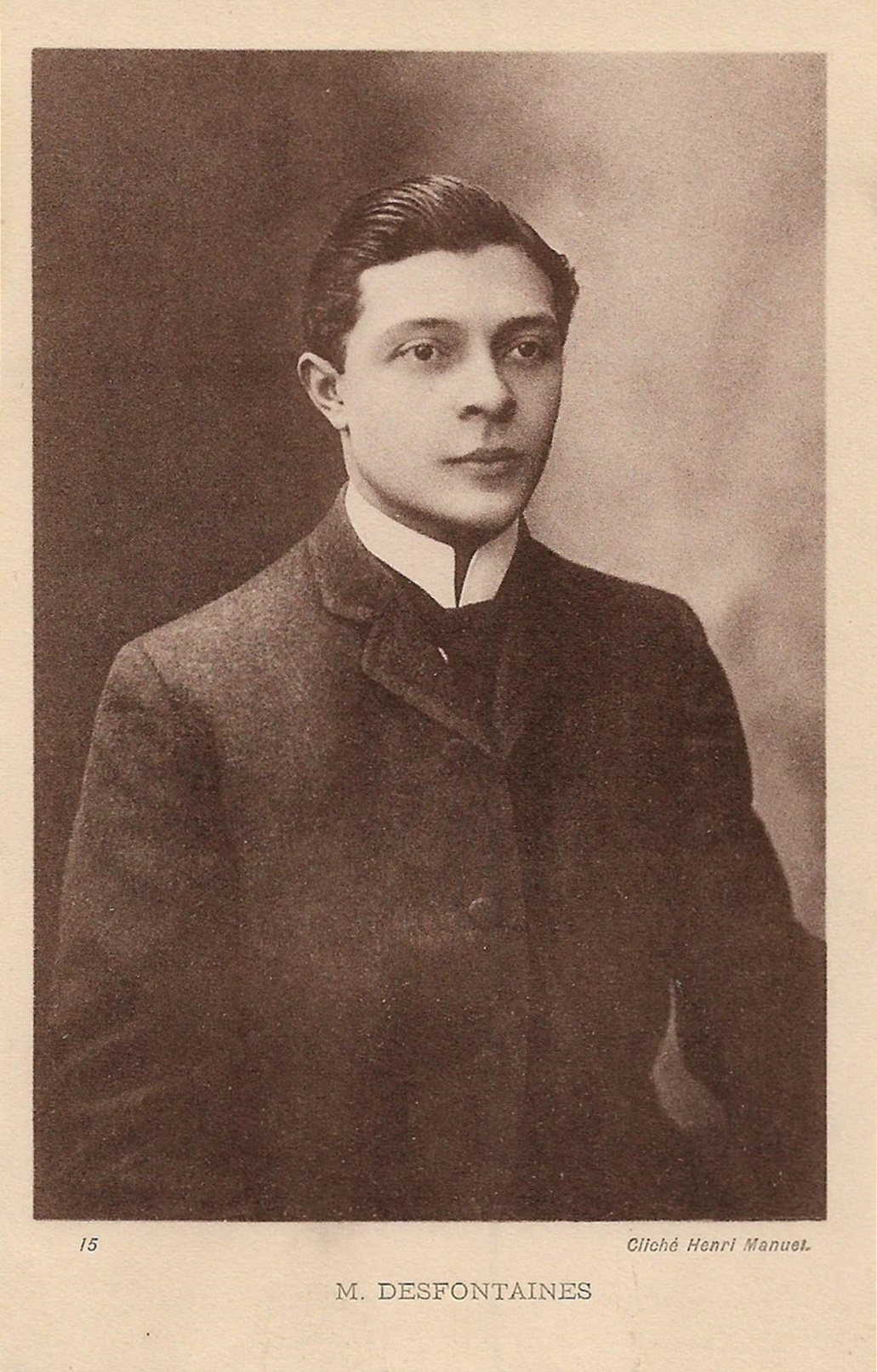
Desfontaines photographed by Henri Manuel

Henri Desfontaines (12 November 1876, Paris – 7 January 1931, Paris) was a French film director, actor, and scriptwriter.

== Filmography ==
=== As director ===
- 1908 : Hamlet
- 1909 : Le Puits et le pendule
- 1910 : Un invité gênant
- 1910 : Shylock, le marchand de Venise (Shylock)
- 1910 : Le Scarabée d'or
- 1910 : Résurrection
- 1910 : La Main verte
- 1910 : Hop-Frog
- 1910 : Le Gendre ingénieux
- 1911 : Oliver Cromwell
- 1911 : La Momie
- 1911 : Milton
- 1911 : La Mègère apprivoisée
- 1911 : Jésus de Nazareth
- 1911 : La Femme-cochère
- 1911 : L'Assassinat d'Henri III
- 1911 : Falstaff
- 1911 : Madame Sans-Gêne
- 1912 : Vaincre ou mourir
- 1912 : Le Page
- 1912 : La Chambre au judas
- 1912 : La Reine Élisabeth (Les Amours de la reine Élisabeth)
- 1913 : Sublime amour
- 1913 : L'Homme nu
- 1913 : La Carabine de la mort
- 1913 : Anne de Boleyn
- 1913 : Adrienne Lecouvreur
- 1913 : Le Secret de Polichinelle
- 1914 : Les Yeux du cœur
- 1914 : Le Téléphone qui accuse
- 1914 : La Reine Margot
- 1914 : Monsieur Vautour
- 1914 : Le Médecin des pauvres
- 1915 : Nouvelle aurore
- 1916 : La Forêt qui écoute
- 1916 : Le Dernier rêve
- 1916 : Chouchou
- 1917 : Un vol étrange
- 1917 : Pour l'Alsace
- 1918 : Pendant la guerre
- 1918 : Les Enfants de France et de la guerre
- 1918 : Les Bleus de l'amour
- 1919 : La Suprême épopée
- 1919 : Sa gosse
- 1920 : La Marseillaise
- 1920 : Autour du mystère
- 1921 : Les Trois Lys
- 1921 : Chichinette et Cie
- 1922 : Son altesse
- 1922 : La Fille des chiffonniers
- 1923 : Madame Flirt
- 1923 : L'Insigne mystérieux
- 1923 : L'Espionne
- 1924 : Château historique
- 1924 : Vers Abecher la mystérieuse
- 1925 : L'Espionne aux yeux noirs
- 1926 : Captain Rascasse
- 1927 : Poker d'as
- 1927 : Belphégor
- 1928 : Le Film du poilu

=== As actor ===
- 1908 : Hamlet
- 1908 : Don Juan
- 1908 : L'Arlésienne
- 1908 : L'Homme aux gants blancs : L'homme aux gants blancs
- 1909 : Une corderie
- 1909 : La Princesse Tarakanowa et Catherine II (Tarakanowa et Catherine II)
- 1909 : Le Roi de Rome
- 1909 : La Peur
- 1909 : La Peau de chagrin
- 1909 : La Fin de Lincoln (La Mort de Lincoln)
- 1909 : L'Héritage de Zouzou
- 1909 : Héliogabale
- 1909 : Fleur de pavé
- 1909 : La Dernière conquête
- 1909 : Le Roman d'une jeune fille pauvre
- 1909 : Pauvre gosse
- 1910 : Sous la terreur
- 1910 : L'Orgueil
- 1911 : Le Roman d'une pauvre fille
- 1911 : Jéus de Nazareth
- 1911 : Camille Desmoulins
- 1911 : L'Assassinat d'Henri III
- 1912 : Antar
- 1912 : Les Amours de la reine Élisabeth (1912)
- 1912 : La Dame aux camélias
- 1914 : Le Secret du châtelain
- 1914 : La Reine Margot
- 1916 : La Forêt qui écoute
- 1916 : La Faute de Pierre Vaisy
- 1916 : Soupçon tragique : Le chef de la sûreté
- 1918 : L'Obstacle
- 1919 : Sa gosse
- 1920 : Autour du mystère
- 1930 : La Maison de la flèche : Bex
- 1931 : The Eaglet : Metternich

=== As scriptwriter ===
- 1914 : Les Yeux du cœur
- 1914 : Le Téléphone qui accuse
- 1920 : Autour du mystère
