= Les Amours de la reine Élisabeth =

1912 French silent film

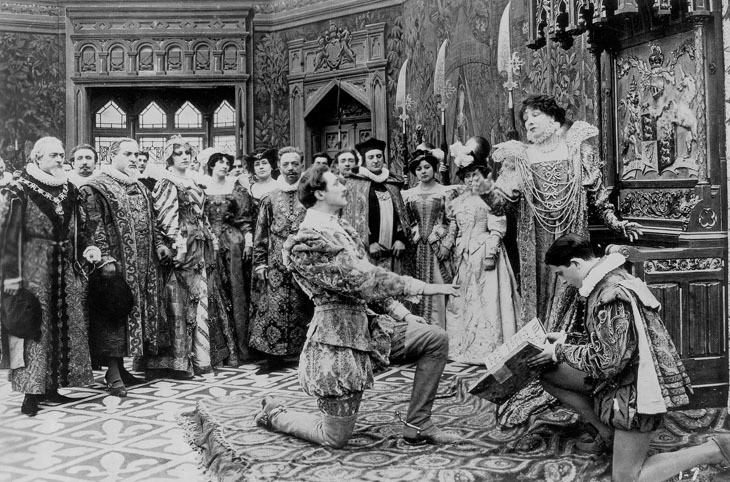
- Still from the film, showing Tellegen and Bernhardt
- Directed by: Louis Mercanton; Henri Desfontaines
- Written by: Émile Moreau
- Based on: Émile Moreau's original play and script
- Produced by: Louis Mercanton Adolph Zukor
- Starring: Sarah Bernhardt; Lou Tellegen
- Cinematography: Clément Maurice
- Music by: Joseph Carl Breil
- Distributed by: L'Histrionic Film (France); Famous Players Film Company (US)
- Release dates: 12 July 1912 (United States premiere); August 1912 (France)
- Running time: 53 minutes (France); 44 minutes (Video version) (US)
- Countries: France; United States
- Language: Intertitle

Les Amours de la reine Élisabeth

Les Amours de la reine Élisabeth (The Loves of Queen Elizabeth), Les Amours d'Élisabeth, Reine d'Angleterre (The Loves of Elizabeth, Queen of England) or La reine Élisabeth (Queen Elizabeth) is a 1912 feature 3-reel silent film based on the love affair between Elizabeth I of England and the Earl of Essex. It was condensed from a play of the same name and directed by Louis Mercanton and Henri Desfontaines. The film starred Sarah Bernhardt as Elizabeth and Lou Tellegen as Essex. Bernhardt by then was 68 and said of the film "This is my last chance at immortality". She and Tellegen were already romantically involved, and this was their second film together. Émile Moreau's play ran for twelve performances in Paris.

== Cast ==
- Sarah Bernhardt as Queen Elizabeth I
- Lou Tellegen as Robert Devereux, Earl of Essex
- Max Maxudian as Charles Howard, 1st Earl of Nottingham
- Nita Romani as Catherine Carey, Countess of Nottingham
- Jean Angelo as Seymour
- Jean Chameroy as Lord Bacon
- Albert Decoeur as Sir Francis Drake
- Georges Deneubourg as Biron
- Marie-Louise Derval as Lady Howard
- Henri Desfontaines
- Guy Favières as Worcester
- Paul Guidé as Shakespeare
- Paul Laurent as Jacques Stuart
- Jane Maylianes as Lady Southwell

== Production ==
Les Amours de la reine Élisabeth production company, L'Histrionic Film, was forced into liquidation by Pathé Frères during the film's production, but it was completed with funds from Adolph Zukor. Zukor also brought it to New York City, where it premiered at the Lyceum Theatre on Broadway. The film's US release (on State Rights basis, on 12 July 1912) was the first release from the Famous Players Film Company. Its success convinced other American companies that feature films were commercially viable. Famous Players, which advertised "Famous Players in Famous Plays", later became Famous Players–Lasky, and then Paramount Pictures. It was shot in London.

Queen Elizabeth had one of the earliest dedicated film scores, composed by Joseph Carl Breil specifically for the production.

== Reception ==
Most modern critics believe that Les Amours de la reine Élisabeth represents regression in cinematography and acting. In the 2006 book Intermediality in Theatre and Performance, editors Chiel Kattenbelt and Freda Chapple felt Bernhardt succeeded in creating an artefact that intentionally signified cryptically.

=== Release ===
The film was released on DVD in 2011.

== See also ==
- The House That Shadows Built (1931 promotional film by Paramount)
