= The Voyage of the Bourrichon Family =

1912 French film by Georges Méliès

- The Voyage of the Bourrichon Family (1913) by Georges Méliès
- Directed by: Georges Méliès
- Produced by: Charles Pathé
- Release date: 2008
- Running time: 405 meters
- Country: France
- Language: Silent

Le Voyage de la famille Bourrichon (known in English as The Voyage of the Bourrichon Family or The Voyage of the Family Bourrichon) is a 1912 French silent film directed by Georges Méliès, based on a music-hall comedy by Eugène Labiche. It is a comedy in the style of Max Linder, and is notable for being Méliès's last film.

Like all of Méliès's 1911–1912 films, The Voyage of the Bourrichon Family was made under the supervision of Charles Pathé and was planned for release by the Pathé Frères studio. The film was probably completed by Méliès at the end of 1912 (or possibly the beginning of 1913), and was advertised as an upcoming release in the French Ciné-Journal in May 1913. Some accounts claim that Pathé did not actually ever release it.

The film was presumed lost as late as 2000, but was rediscovered in time to be included on a 2008 DVD collection of Méliès's films.
