= Middelheim Open Air Sculpture Museum =

Open air museum in Antwerp, Belgium

Coordinates: 51°10′54″N 4°24′49″E

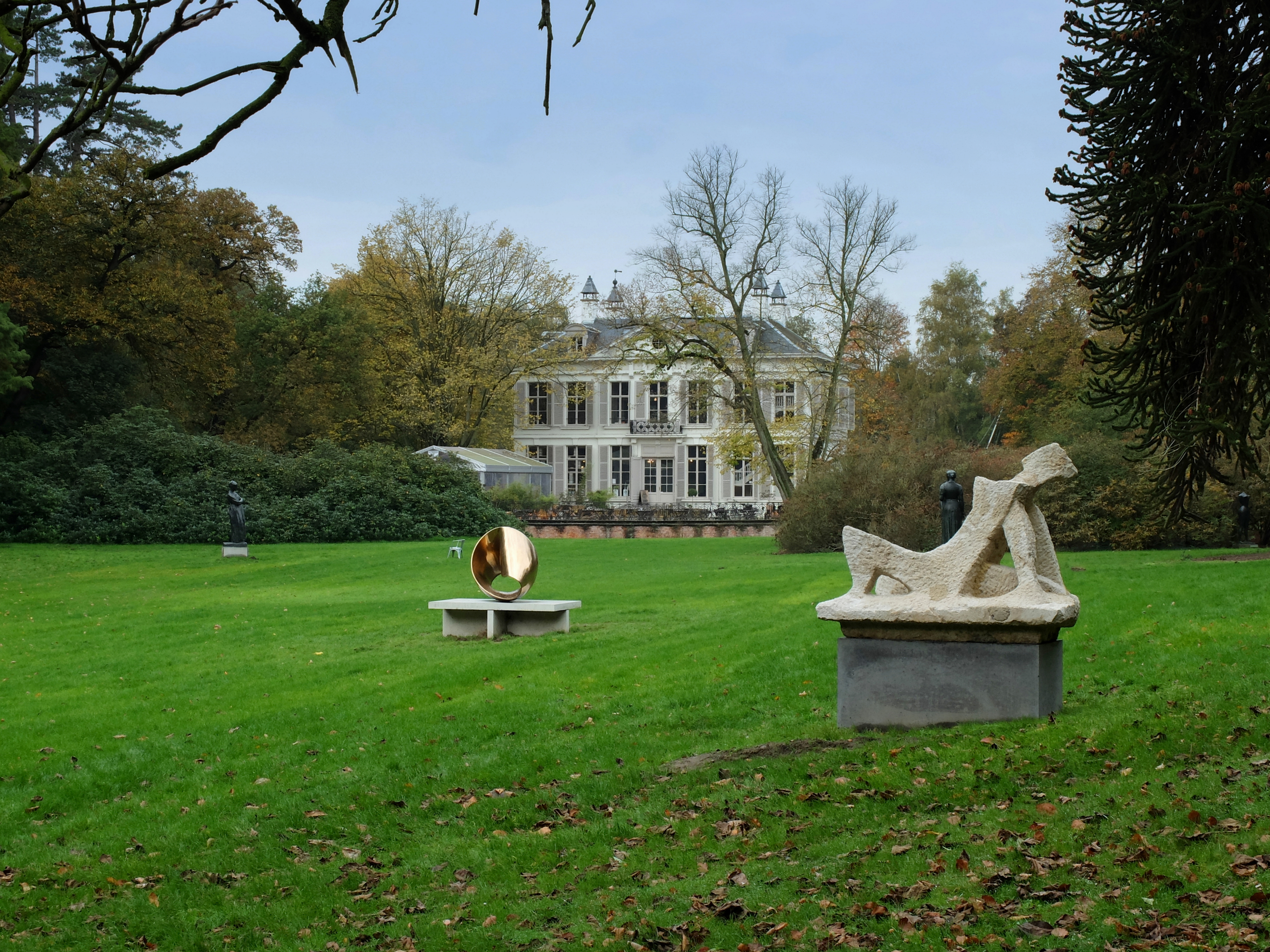
Middelheim Open Air Sculpture Museum

Middelheim Open Air Sculpture Museum (Dutch Beeldentuin Middelheim Museum) is a sculpture park of 24 hectares in the park part of the Middelheim Nachtegalen Park at Antwerp. The Middelheim Museum collection has approximately 400 works of art on display. These include around 215 sculptures, featuring artists such as Carl Andre, Franz West, Auguste Rodin and many more. Along with the addition of new works every year, the museum invites contemporary artists to engage in an artistic conversation with works part of the permanent collection and the environment surrounding them, leading to the establishment of performances and exhibitions and by various kinds of artists. Works such as ones by Roman Signer and Ai Weiwei are also created specifically for the museum. (“Middelheim Museum”)

The museum includes the Braem pavilion, designed by the Belgian architect Renaat Braem. He is seen as a significant symbol for post-war architecture in Belgium and aimed to blur the boundaries between architecture and art. Reflective of this, Braem aimed to design the pavilion to incorporate a sculptural quality to organically merge it with the park’s landscape. The design developed into a set of closed pavilions and open patios, formulated “as nature would”, with an accessible entrance and a distinct roof structure to create an ever-changing spatial experience augmented by the flow of light through the pavilion. The rudimentary base was placed in 1969, and the pavilion was then officially introduced at the eleventh Biennial in 1971. Plans for construction around the pavilion were left unfinished with a fountain by Olivier Strebelle being the only trace, which speaks to the idea of merging architecture with nature as it embraces the idea of imperfection. (“The Braem Pavilion”) Another fountain by the Belgian artist Philippe Van Snick is placed in front of the pavilion. (“Middelheim Museum”)

The Braem Pavilion is exclusive to fragile works from the permanent collection, such as ones by Alberto Giacometti, Jean Arp, and Wim Delvoye, to maintain them suitably. The works exhibited at the pavilion change twice a year. (“Middelheim Museum”)

A 750-meter pathway begins at the Braem Pavilion and runs past the Middelheim Castle and over Middelheimlaan to ‘Hortiflora’, a botanical flower garden part of Nachtegalenpark until it was added to the Middelheim Museum in 2012. With this inclusion, the museum covers more than thirty hectares of park and exhibition area. (“Middelheim Museum”)

The merging of art and nature is a significant aspect of the museum. This is seen through the displayed works, the kinds of exhibitions curated and the pavilions and structure of the open-aired museum itself. In the works exhibited, their placement is just as important as the works themselves because the intermingling of the works with their natural surroundings transforms and augments the experience of the viewer.

== History ==
In 1342, Middelheim is mentioned as a stede geheten Middelheim. Since the 16th century, it was used as a summer residence for rich merchants from Antwerp. In the 18th century, Pierre François Gisbert van Schorel, Lord of Wilrijk brought an important art collection in the castle featuring notable artworks from Rubens and Van Dyck among others.

Then, the estate was ceded to the Knight Parthon de Von where he wrote the Fables and dedicated himself to horticulture. In 1842, it was sold to the Le Grelle family, which sold it to the Antwerp municipality in 1910.

== Overview ==
The Middelheimmuseum park is known for its sculpture, which arose from the 'Biennale Middelheim', which was held in the park every two years since 1951. After twenty episodes of this sculpture exhibition in 1989 they decided to choose another way to supplement the image collection. The layout of the sculpture park has the shape of four fluttering strips on both sides of the Middelheimlaan, that cuts through the middle of the park.

The collection comprises two hundred images, including several dozen installed in the city of Antwerp. In addition, the Open Air Museum has hundreds of sculptures which are displayed through temporary exhibitions in the Braem Pavilion. In this pavilion fragile pieces are lined up that can not be place outdoors. The Burgemeester Lode Craeybeckx documentation centre of the sculpture park is located in the Orangerie of the Middelheimpark.

In 2012, the botanical garden Hortiflora with an area of 5 hectares was added to the existing sculpture park. This creates a natural connection to the Nachtegalen Park. On the side of the Hortiflora the architect Paul Robbrecht designed a new half open exhibition building called The House. This is a five meter high transparent semi volume with a clear geometry. In his own words the designer sees the building as an intimate building, populated with temporary residents. It wants to be a space that nurtures and protects. Not oversized, like most contemporary museums but on a human scale: A pavilion that makes possible a temporary one-to-one relationship with art. The planner has also outlined new lines into the existing landscape.

== Works ==
A notable work includes Ai Weiwei’s The Bridge Without a Name from 2012, which was commissioned by the museum. The artist is known for using materials sparingly and thus, he recycled a small bridge that was present at the sculpture park and added his touch to it. He replaced the original deck of the bridge with planks that formed the contours of his homeland, China. Incorporating the elements of China such as its topography in his work is common for the artist as he has a complicated and passionate relationship with the country. He refers to himself as a “readymade”, alluding to Marcel Duchamp’s conceptual work, due to his implementation of Chinese cultural objects as found materials in his own work. The bridge is redolent of the small bridges in Asian drawings, but also stems from a stronger root of the implications of metaphorically crossing a bridge. His installations propel the viewer to challenge the status quo and the powers that be, aiming for a change in mindset and to evoke people’s individual sense of responsibility. “In a rational society, the artist’s role is similar to that of a virus. Even the smallest design can cause chaos in the world. Art sharpens the alertness of rational truth. The power of art lies in its awareness of the cultured and psychological subversion.” (“Ai Weiwei”)

Another prominent work by Lawrence Weiner in 1995 lines the building that sits along the entrance of the park. The work consists of red letters with a thin black outline painted on the white wall, reading “IJZER & GOUD IN DE LUCHT STUIFMEEL & ROOK OP DE GROND”. This translates to “iron & gold in the air dust & smoke on the ground” in English, as written in the same bold red letters below the Dutch statement. A common aspect of Weiner’s work is that language is his material because he believes that describing the work without realizing it allows the viewer to create their own mental work of art through their imagination that only exists in a virtual reality. He finds importance in environmental factors that can alter the mood of the viewer as it shifts the quality of the work. Weiner also tends to adapt his work to the place it will be exhibited as it makes viewers more receptive to the words and the ideas they convey. Although the text on the wall is not painted by Weiner in this piece, but rather according to his instructions, it still carries layers of meaning; it refers to the First World War, with the iron in the air symbolizing the airplanes and the dust on the ground suggesting the impact of grenades. (“Middelheim Museum Online Catalogue: IJZER”) The symbolic aspect of the words and the lack of imagery in the piece allows people to recall their own individual experiences during the war as well as the common mood of the country and impact on people’s lives.

Carl Andre’s 74 Weathering Way from 2001 consists of seventy-four identical steel plates placed adjacent to each other on the ground. However, its position invites constant wear and tear due to moisture and its interaction with the viewer, and hence, differences amongst these identical plates become visible over time, adding a dynamic quality to the work. The sculpture is integrated with the space and the space is part of the sculpture. Carl Andre creates a unique interaction through this concept. This type of interaction challenges the common viewing experience of a work as it lies on the ground, and it adds an extra dimension to the work since the viewer not only looks at it, but also walks over it. A physical connection is molded between the work and the viewer through this experience. This work is reflective of Andre’s style; he tends to create sculptures from wooden blocks, stones and metal plates. Its minimal quality pertains to the minimalism art movement that began in the 1960s, after World War II, as the content of the work and the intended meaning is subordinate to the idea and experience the viewer receives from it. 74 Weathering Way was acquired through Carl Andre’s “Works on Land” exhibition in the Middelheim Museum in 2001. (“Middelheim Museum Online Catalogue: 74”)

== Exhibitions ==
Similar to that of Carl Andre, the Middelheim Museum hosts many exhibitions and commonly adds some of the exhibited works to their permanent collection.

Antony Gormley: Firmament and other Forms (2013)

Gormley is an artist from the United Kingdom who is inspired by the human body and its spatial relationships to create his sculptures and installations. He also finds interest in the more rudimentary biological phenomena of the body such as cell structure and DNA. (“Antony Gormley”)

In 2012, Firmament III (2009) was added to the Middelheim Museum’s collection and was placed in the oldest section of the museum designed by Robbrecht and Daem, the ‘Het Huis’ exhibition pavilion. The work consists of an irregular three-dimensional net encircling a human-shaped void around ten times lifesize. Its spatial influence shifts over time as it picks up light of the changing seasons. This relationship encourages the viewer to consider their place in the larger context of societal order. (“Antony Gormley”)

This work was officially introduced during the opening of Gormley’s 2013 exhibit at the Middelheim Museum, Firmament and other Forms. The exhibition featured a series of Gormley’s ‘polyhedra’ sculptures that had not been exhibited together in this manner. The works were placed on the ‘Hortiflora’ of the pavilion to add emphasis on their presence. The location allowed for the engagement of an explicit interchange between the works and the weather conditions, the light and the continuously evolving natural environment. As Gormley states, “this exhibition reflects on the human body’s connection with architecture. All the works start from the bubble matrix, a random yet consistent geometry, which occurs in nature and also forms the structural syntax of Firmament III.” (“Antony Gormley”)

Ana Mendieta: Earthbound (2019)

Ana Mendieta is known for innovative and creative treatment of art in the postwar era. She produced a variety of works, such as performances, installations, films, sculptures, drawings and photographs, and worked with a unique blend of performance, earth art and sculpture. She was not only a pioneer in the form her work took, but also in its content and meaning by addressing the controversies of history, gender and culture. (“Ana Mendieta”)

Mendieta’s 2019 exhibit, Earthbound, was located in the Braem pavilion of the Middelheim Museum and was a collaboration with the Estate of Ana Mendieta Collection & Galerie Lelong & Co. The exhibited works reflect Mendieta’s strong interest in the elements and their natural energy in relation to the power of nature. (“Ana Mendieta”)

“I believe in water, air, and earth. They are all deities.” (Ana Mendieta, 1948-1985)

Her work involves a direct bodily relationship with nature, embodying both a manner of individual self-representation and a connection to universal ancestral power. Through this, the exhibition stimulates thought upon how we relate to nature and our surrounding environment as human beings. By cognizing the idea of nature and its elements being active and having agency, Mendieta challenges the boundaries of history, religion and identity. Her works raise fundamental questions about the norms of society and depict a shift in perspective on sculpture traditions from one shaped by figurative sculpture to one merged with land art and performance. (“Ana Mendieta”)

== Collection ==
The collection includes works by many leading sculptors of modern and contemporary visual art, among others:

- Ai Weiwei (The Bridge Without a Name)
- Carl Andre (74 Weathering Way)
- Mari Andriessen (Bomb victim from 1948/51)
- Hans Arp (Scales Tree, 1947–54)
- Rudolf Belling (Dreiklang, 1919)
- Wander Bertoni (Icarus, 1953)
- Joseph Bernard (Dancing woman and child, 1925)
- Max Bill (Endless winding, 1953–56)
- Stig Blomberg (Bathing children, 1935)
- Emile-Antoine Bourdelle (The unruly ram, 1909; Heracles Archer, 1909; Dr. Koeberle, 1914)
- Chris Burden (Beam Drop Middelheimmuseum from 2009)
- Guillaume Bijl (Roman Street from 1994)
- Alexander Calder (The Dog, 1958)
- Agustín Cárdenas (L, 1968)
- Tony Cragg (Envelope)
- Eugène Dodeigne (Kneeling Figure, 1970; Three single people, 1978)
- Arthur Dupon (Torso from 1925)
- Jan Fabre (Installation architectural work with guided trees)
- Luciano Fabro (Bagnati)
- Pericle Fazzini (Sibilla, 1947)
- Pablo Gargallo (The Prophet, 1933)
- Emile Gilioli (In Heaven from 1954/55)
- Dan Graham (Belgian Fun, 2004)
- George Grard (Niobe from 1947/48)
- Karl Hartung (Composition II, 1949)
- Bernhard Heiliger (In relation standing figures, 1954)
- Barbara Hepworth (Cantate Domino, 1958)
- Floris Jespers (Black Women Group, 1953)
- Oscar Jespers (Birth, 1932)
- Phillip King (Bali, 1977)
- Per Kirkeby (Brick Sculpture)
- Georg Kolbe (Large sitting from 1929)
- Hildo Krop (Urge to life from 1949/51)
- Jef Lambeaux (Wrestlers from 1895)
- Henri Laurens (Océanide, 1933)
- Mark Macken (April, 1957)
- Aristide Maillol (River from 1939/43)
- Pierre-Auguste Renoir and Richard Guino (Venus Victrix from 1914/16)
- Giacomo Manzù (The dance step, 1950, and Cardinal, 1952)
- Marcel Martí
- Arturo Martini (Invernali, 1931, Chiaro di luna 1932 and Giochi invernali)
- Marcello Mascherini (St. Francis, 1957)
- Bernard Meadows (Pointing figure with a child from 1966)
- Constantin Meunier ( The Sower from 1896 and the bump carrier in 1898)
- George Minne (Mans Torso from 1910)
- Yasuo Mizui (White Flame from 1975).
- Henry Moore (King and Queen, 1952–53)
- Louise Nevelson (Sun Disk / Moonshadow V, 1976)
- François Pompon (Polar Bear, 1920)
- Germaine Richier (The Mantis (Mantis), 1946)
- Auguste Rodin (Balzac in 1892, Bronze Age from 1880, John the Baptist from 1880)
- Bernard Rosenthal (Odyssey I, 1967)
- Roman Signer (Installation Ski anticipation of a container shaped volume)
- Olivier Strebelle (Fountain, 1951)
- Albert Szukalski (Dialog, 1974)
- Jesús Rafael Soto (Double progression vert et blanc, 1969)
- Timm Ulrichs (Modelhäuser, type Bomarzo, 2001)
- Hilde Van Sumere (Movement II, 1974-1976)
- Drago Tršar (Manifestants, 1957)
- Alberto Viani (Female Torso from 1954)
- Lawrence Weiner
- Franz West
- Andre Willequet
- Rik Wouters (The Mad Maiden from 1912, Homely care from 1913)
- Ossip Zadkine (The Phoenix from 1944).

== Gallery ==
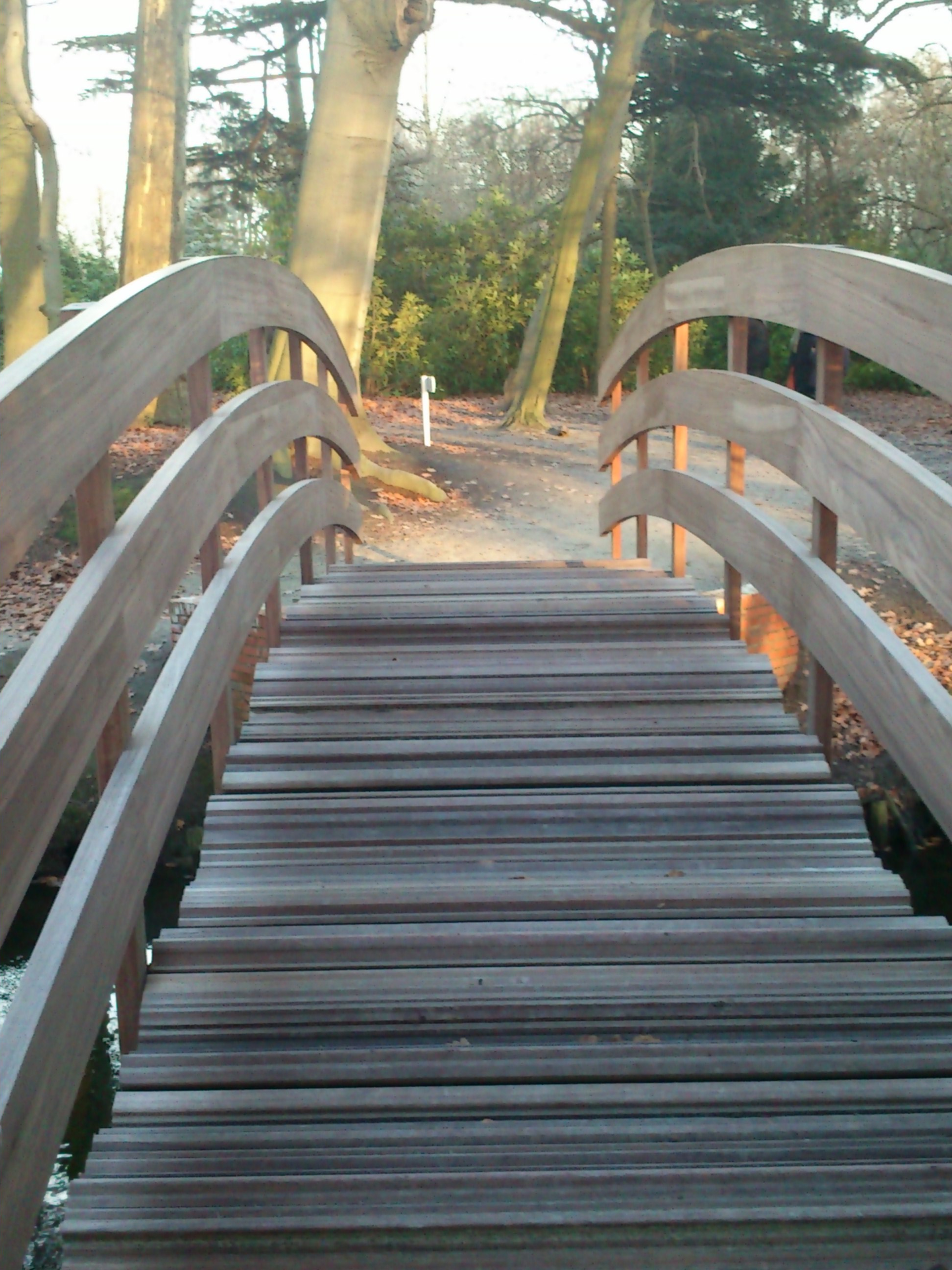
Bridge by Ai Weiwei

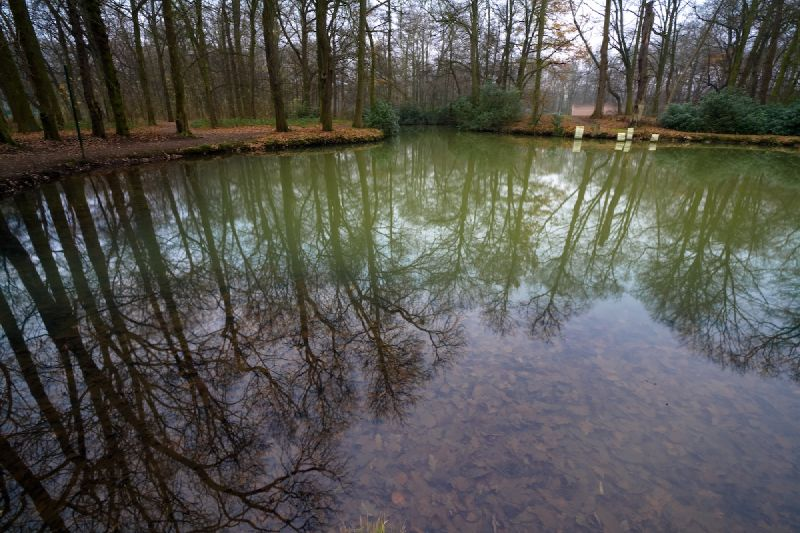
Baigneurs by Luciano Fabro, 1994

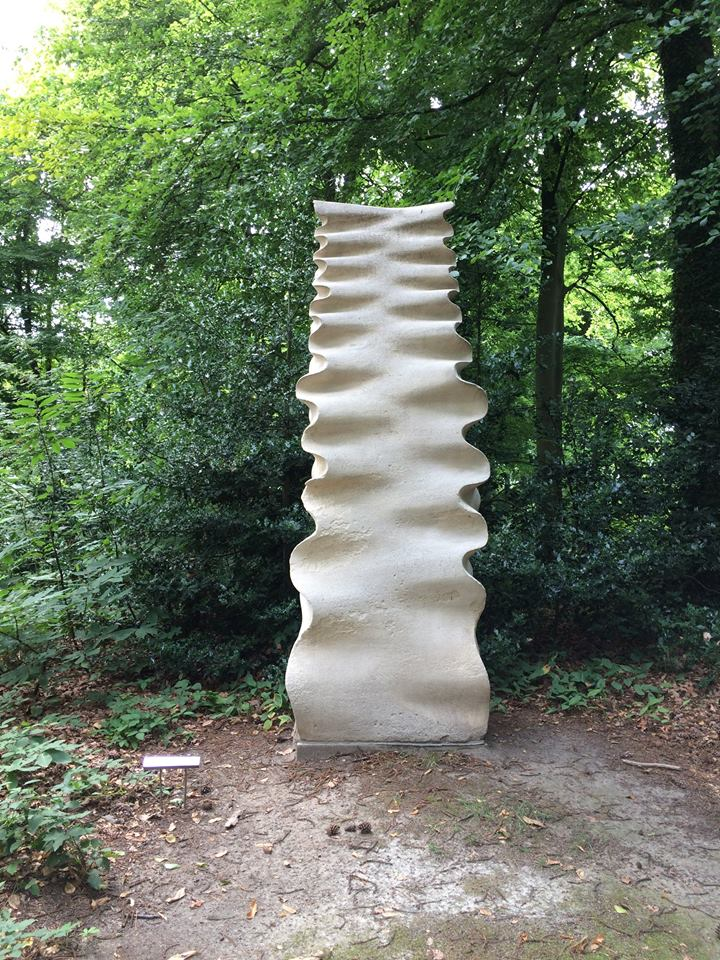
White Flame by
Yasuo Mizui, 1975

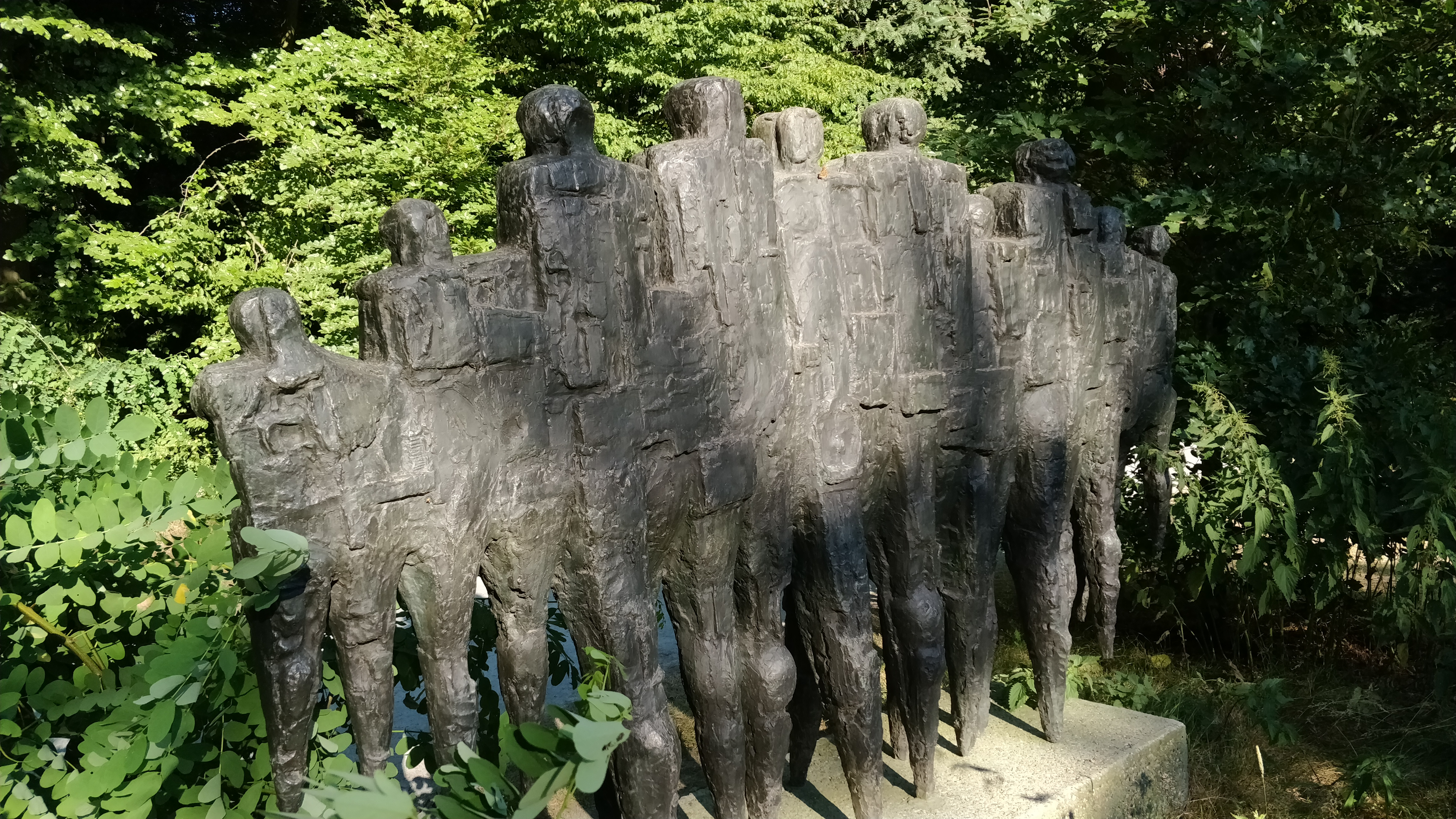
Manifestants by Drago Tršar, 1957
