= Rik Wouters =

Belgian painter and sculptor (1882–1916)

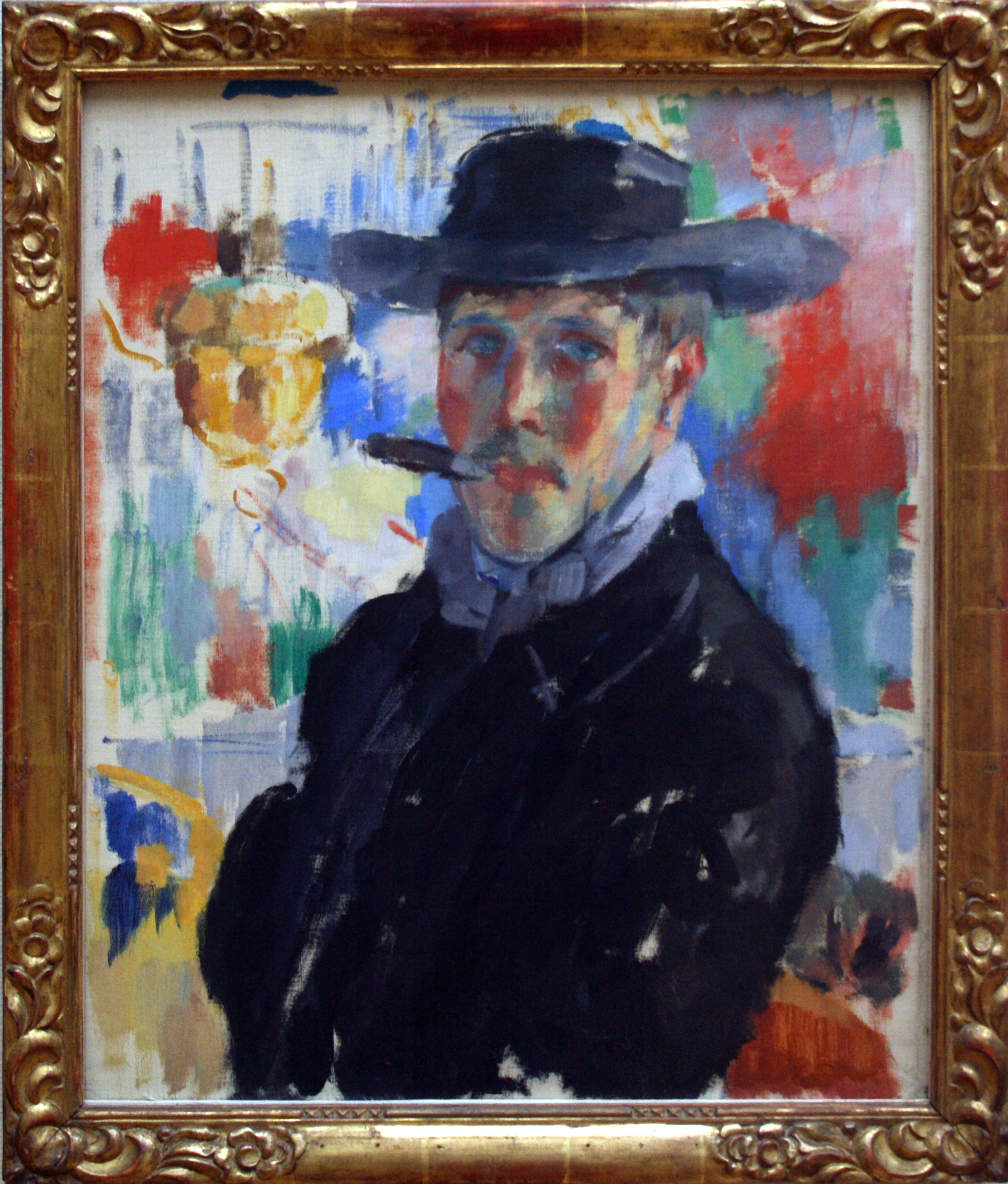
- Self-Portrait with Cigar (1914)
- Born: Hendrik Emil Wouters; 21 August 1882; Mechelen, Belgium
- Died: 11 July 1916 (aged 33); Amsterdam, Netherlands
- Style: Fauvism
- Spouse: Hélène Philomène Lionardine Duerinckx

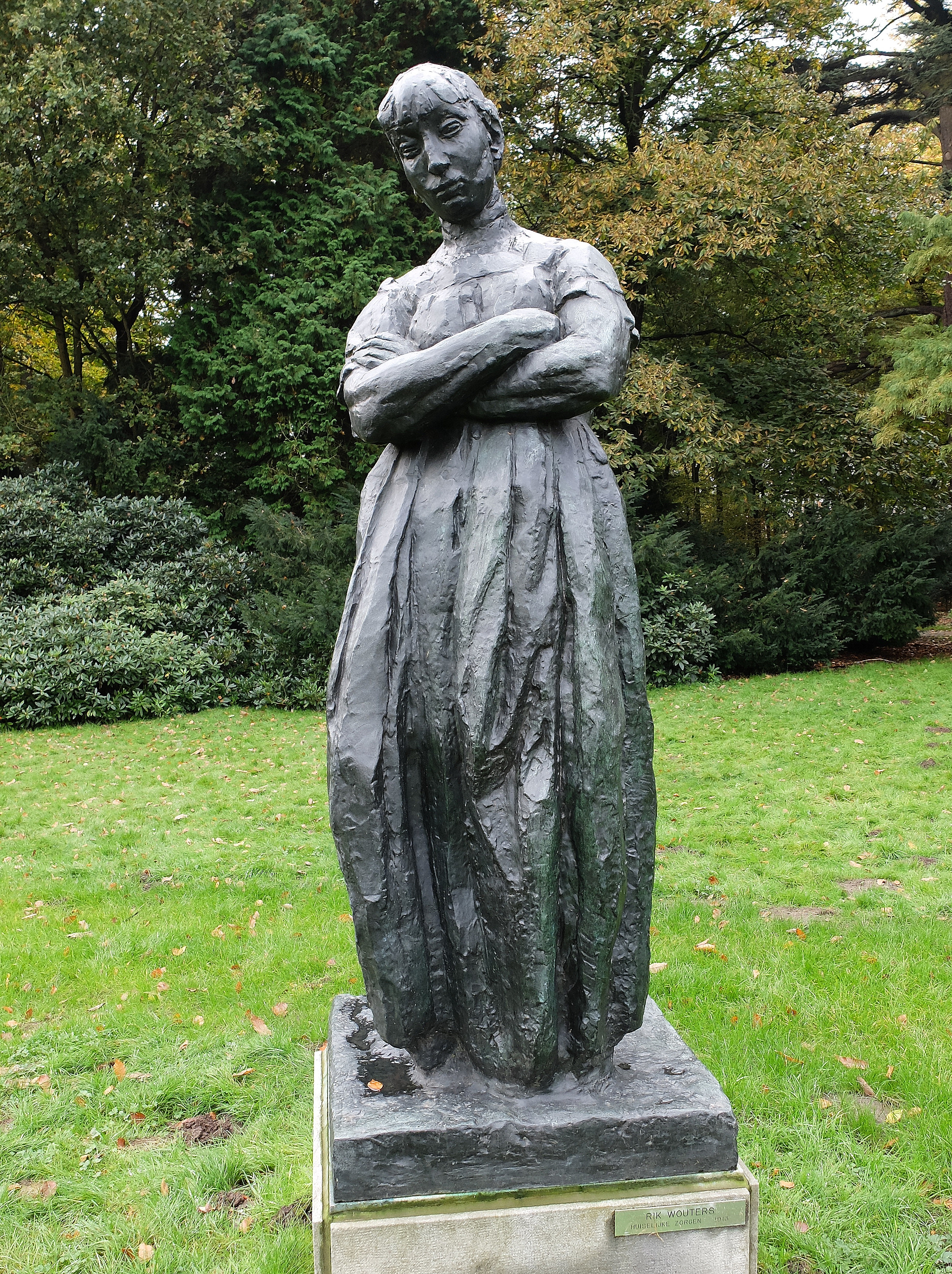
Sculpture "Huiselijke zorgen" at Middelheim Open Air Sculpture Museum, Antwerp

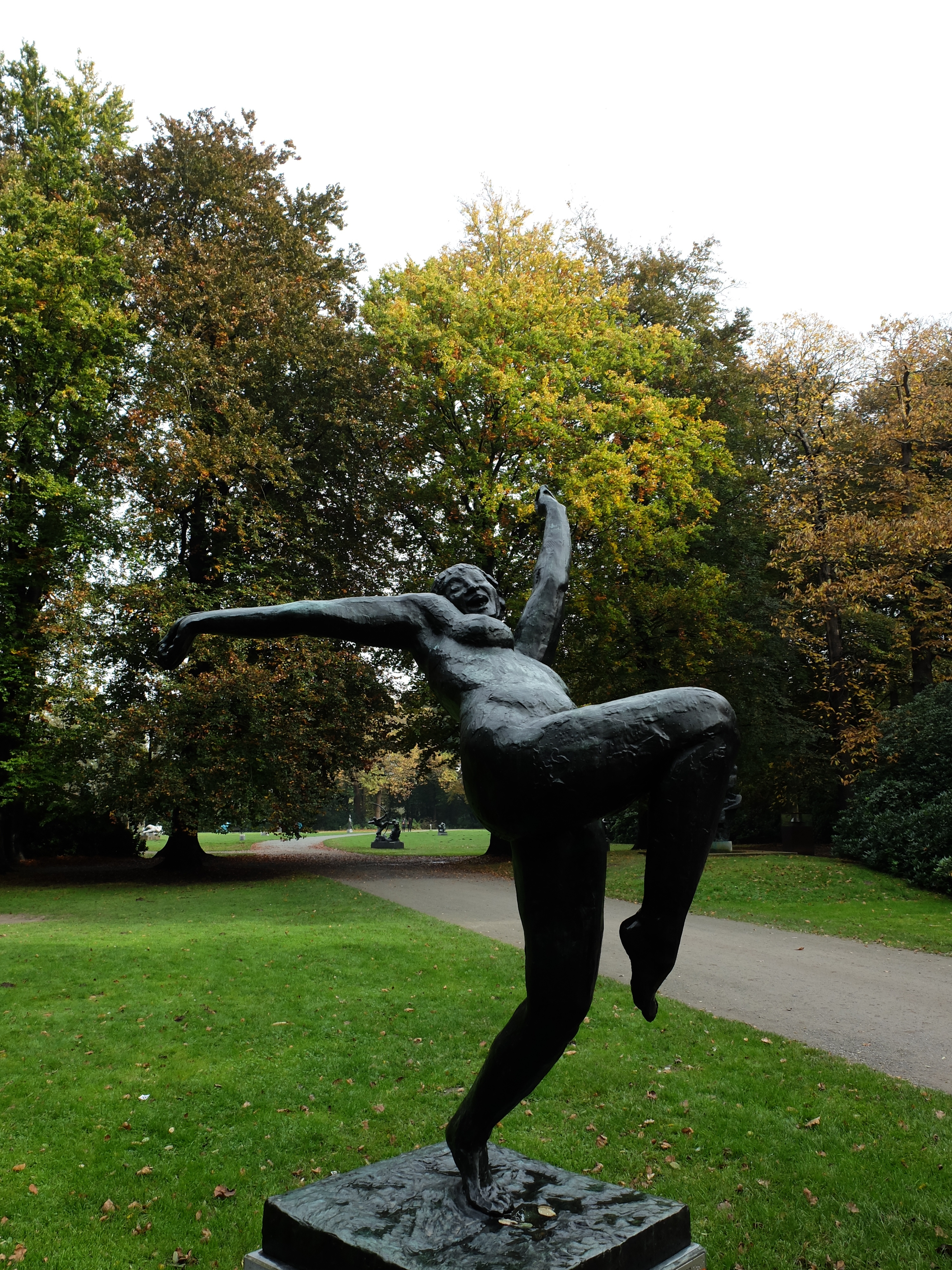
Sculpture "Het zotte geweld" at Middelheim Open Air Sculpture Museum, Antwerp

Hendrik Emil (Rik) Wouters (21 August 1882 – 11 July 1916) was a Belgian painter, sculptor and draughtsman. Wouters produced 200 paintings, drawings and sculptures in his 34 years before his illness-caused death. He died partway through the First World War on 11 July 1916 in Amsterdam. A sculptor, painter, draughtsman and etcher of typically fauvist style, Wouters' art resembled the works of artists including Henri Matisse, Paul Cézanne and André Derain – the "forefathers" of Fauvism.

Rik Wouters' art, according to Adams (2018), reflects themes of "warmth and tenderness", his paintings characterised by an array of colours and brush strokes, frequently leaving unpainted canvas to increase this effect. Often depicting his muse-wife, Hélène, Wouters disregarded hidden symbolic inferences within his art in favour of a more "simplistic and genuine" style, distancing himself from mainstream artists. Wouters was educated in fine arts academies in Mechelen and Brussels, however his works usually slightly differ stylistically from other Fauvist artists.

Wouters is known primarily for his sculptures and paintings including 'Lady in blue' (1914), 'Self-portrait with cigar' (1914) and Chrysanthèmes (1915).

== Early life ==
Hendrik Emil Wouters was born on 21 August 1882 in Mechelen, Belgium. His father, Emil Wouters, was an ornamental sculptor and his mother, Melania Daems, was a housewife. Wouters' mother died in 1888. After dropping out of school at age 12, he began working on wooden sculptures and furniture decorations in his father's workshop and developed a passion for the craft. It was here that he met and began working with fellow Mechelen-born sculptor Ernest Wijnants, who would remain a lifelong friend. In 1912, Wouters painted a portrait of his friend, entitled Portrait of Ernest Wijnants. Wouters also developed an interest in drawing, and practiced in his free time.

In 1897, aged fifteen, Wouters left his father's workshop in pursuit of a career as an artist and sculptor.

== Education and apprenticeship ==
Having left the workshop, Rik Wouters enrolled at the Academy of Mechelen in 1897. He remained a pupil for 4 years; until 1901. Wouters applied to the Academy of Brussels in 1900, but was only admitted in 1901, resulting in a relocation to the Belgian capital to begin his tutelage under Charles Van der Stappen. Restricted by the mores of the institution, Wouters was unable to produce any works of originality and so painted within popular methodologies, including hidden iconographical meanings – a style he would later reject. Wouters achieved high results in the academy, ranking first in sculpture and second in historical composition. Regardless of his academic success, Wouters burned his works at the end of each year of his apprenticeship. His earliest completed surviving pieces of sculpture are from 1907 and his earliest paintings date from 1908.

Edith Hoffman (1956) suggests that in these early works, although proficient in both crafts, Wouters remained "dependant on those masters he admired most", and that it wasn't until 1909 for his sculpting and 1910 for his painting that he became "completely individual".

During his education in Brussels Wouters met Hélène Philomène Leonardine Duerinckx, born in Schaerbeek on 18 October 1886. Hélène, known as "Nel", would become Wouters' wife and greatest muse. The two were acquainted in 1902 and married three years later, in Amsterdam on April 15, 1905.

== Career ==
Rik Wouters' The Nymph (an unfinished sculpture created during 1904 and 1905) is considered to be his "breakthrough" piece as it represented his desire to escape the restrictions of the academy as well as the limits his own talent, although it was never finished nor sold.

Following the completion of his studies, Wouters and his wife moved into a house in Watermael. However, Wouters was unable to support himself financially and so moved back in with his father in Mechelen. Again helping his father, Wouters failed to produce anything he deemed as satisfactory. He and his wife only intended to stay with his father for a short period, so he briefly worked for a porcelain manufacturer to make enough money to move to the countryside (in Boitsfort) in order to accommodate Hélène's recently contracted tuberculosis. They did this (in 1907) for clean air upon the advice of a doctor they had seen in the east side of Brussels however it also allowed Wouters an opportunity to paint freely. Initially Wouters primarily made sketches and developed his etching in the evenings. Sculpting began to occupy a larger portion of his focus over the next year and, in 1908, he modelled 12 bronze statues.

Here Wouters experimented with light, unmixed colours, painting the cardboard evenly with a palette knife. He achieved three-dimensionality through colour contrasts – shadowing with darker reds, blues or greens – but rarely using drawn contours. Preferring to paint still lifes and interiors, Wouters created a "vibrant atmosphere" through the use of contrast and large strokes. This can be seen in works like 'Portrait of a woman in grey' (1905) and Portrait of a young boy (1905).

Completely free of academic rigidity, Wouters was awarded second place in the Godecharle competition for his work Rêverie (1907) in 1907. This gave him access to a state allowance of 500 francs, allowing him to pay rent for the next two years. Despite this payment, Wouters and Hélène saved food in order to afford expensive paint.

Over the next 4 years, Wouters further developed his style, using "highly sought-after plays of light and space", attracting the attention of Georges Giroux, who offered a contract with "Galerie Georges Giroux" in 1912. This contract granted Wouters the financial assistance required for him to work with his choice of materials, allowing him to produce works far more frequently. In 1912, he painted 60 canvasses, providing the money to travel to Paris and discover the Impressionists. Rik Wouters was the first Belgian artist to commit to a gallery contract of this kind. Whilst demonstrating the confidence the gallerist had in his art, it also meant that his profits were being split 50/50.

Upon visiting Paris, Wouters saw the works of Cézanne, Monet, Renoir and Matisse, with whom he became increasingly appreciative of. According to Hoffman (1956), it was during this trip that he began to prioritise the "colour and light" of painting over his previous love of sculpting. He adopted a clearer and brighter palette and began to use light cloth in order to better preserve the colour tone. Additionally, Wouters started to dilute the oil paint with turpentine. He would then apply this thinly and sparsely across the canvas. Further experimentation with watercolours and the use of blank canvas began to create an effect which Julie Beckers (2017) describes as a "seemingly unfinished piece" which is used to "invite the observer to finish the strokes on his behalf". This can be seen in works such as By the window, Boitsfort (1913). Although many enjoyed this "unfinished" aesthetic, fellow artists in particular were appreciative of his style.

Over the next few years (1912–13), he produced the best works of his short career. During this period he painted and drew almost constantly, making 50 canvasses in 1912. The crazy violence, Domestic worries and De strijkster are among the most famous of his art, all produced during this period. In 1913, he won the Picard prize.

Although his wife occupied the focus of the majority of his works (around 75% of his oeuvre), Wouters occasionally painted other people and places of particular interest to him. His other muses included natural scapes from his local area (such as trees in the garden or a vase of flowers on the table) or close friends (such as his friend and fellow sculptor, Ernest Wijnants). All of which were painted with the same colourful and bright style. Additionally, Wouters produced a number of self portraits over his painting years. Initially, these were painted in his usual method, however, as his health worsened he began to adopt a bleaker palette, reflecting his situation.

== Final years ==
Having returned to Belgium, Wouters borrowed 10,000 francs in order to buy a block of land upon which he built a house based on his own architectural designs. He and Nel moved into the new home in the spring of 1914.

The First World War enveloped Belgium in 1914 and Wouters was mobilised to the front for over 6 weeks near the city of Liège. After the final fortress there fell, he fled from the Germans with his unit. He then arrived in Antwerp and was deployed in Fort Haasdonk. Wouters also got his first individual exhibition (in Giroux hall) during this year however the symptoms of his disease were beginning to manifest. He was captured and was taken to prisoner-of-war camps in Amersfoort and Zeist, but was provided with materials to paint and draw with. During this time, however, Wouters began to develop eye cancer and his health worsened.

In 1915, he was released from the camp on health-related grounds and was reunited with his wife, Nel. In these years he lived with Hélène in an apartment in Amsterdam. The sombre tone of his paintings reflects his worsening health, seen in works such as Self-portrait with black eye patch (1916) and Rik with black eye dressing (1916). Wouters lost his eye to cancer 3 months before his death on 11 July 1916.

Hélène remained in Amsterdam until 1919. She then moved backed to Belgium and remarried. She died in 1971, aged 85.

== Paintings ==
Wouters has created the following paintings:

Paintings in the Royal Museum of Fine Arts Antwerp
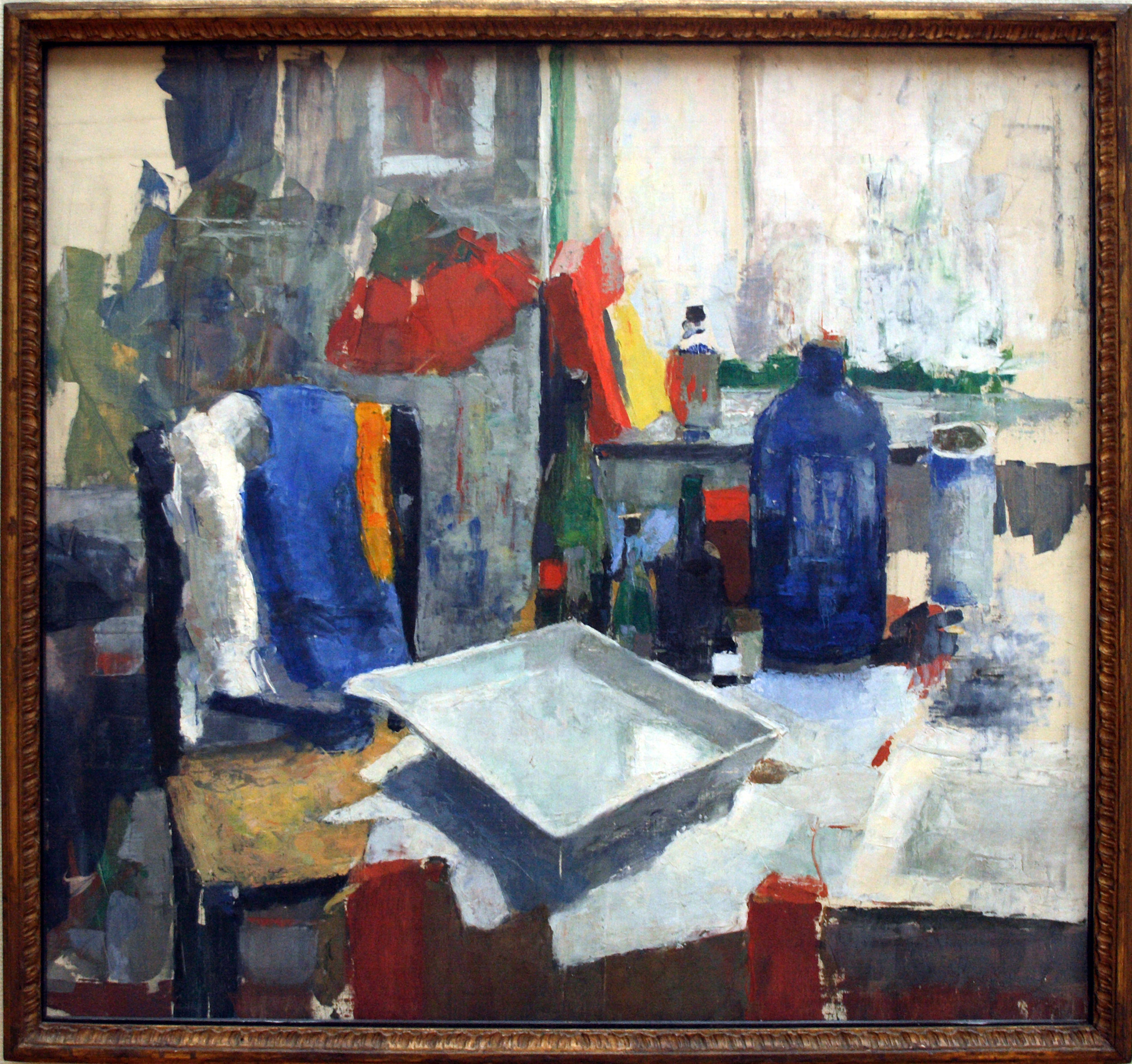
Dining Table (1908)

Woman Ironing (1912)

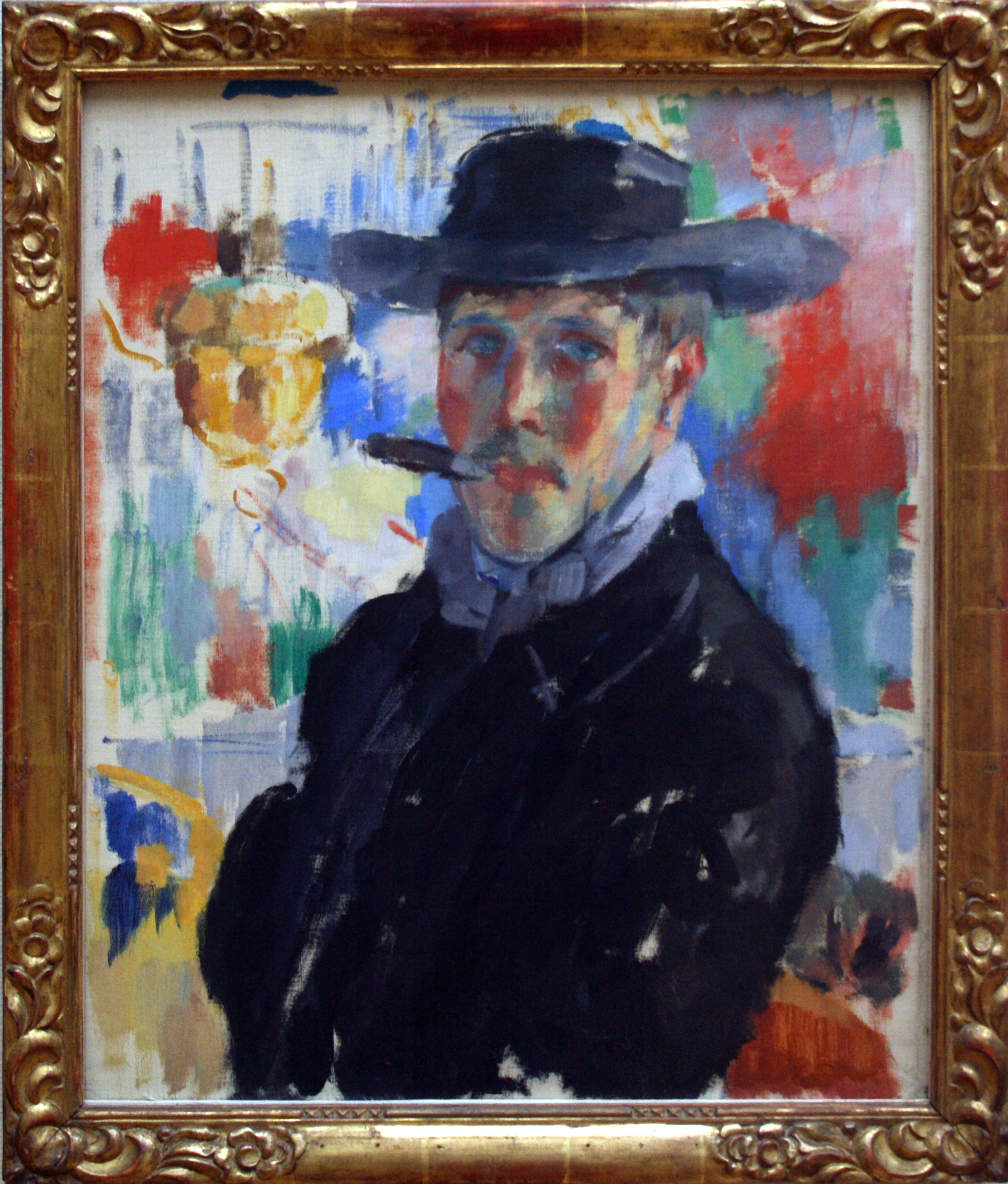
Self-Portrait with Cigar (1914)

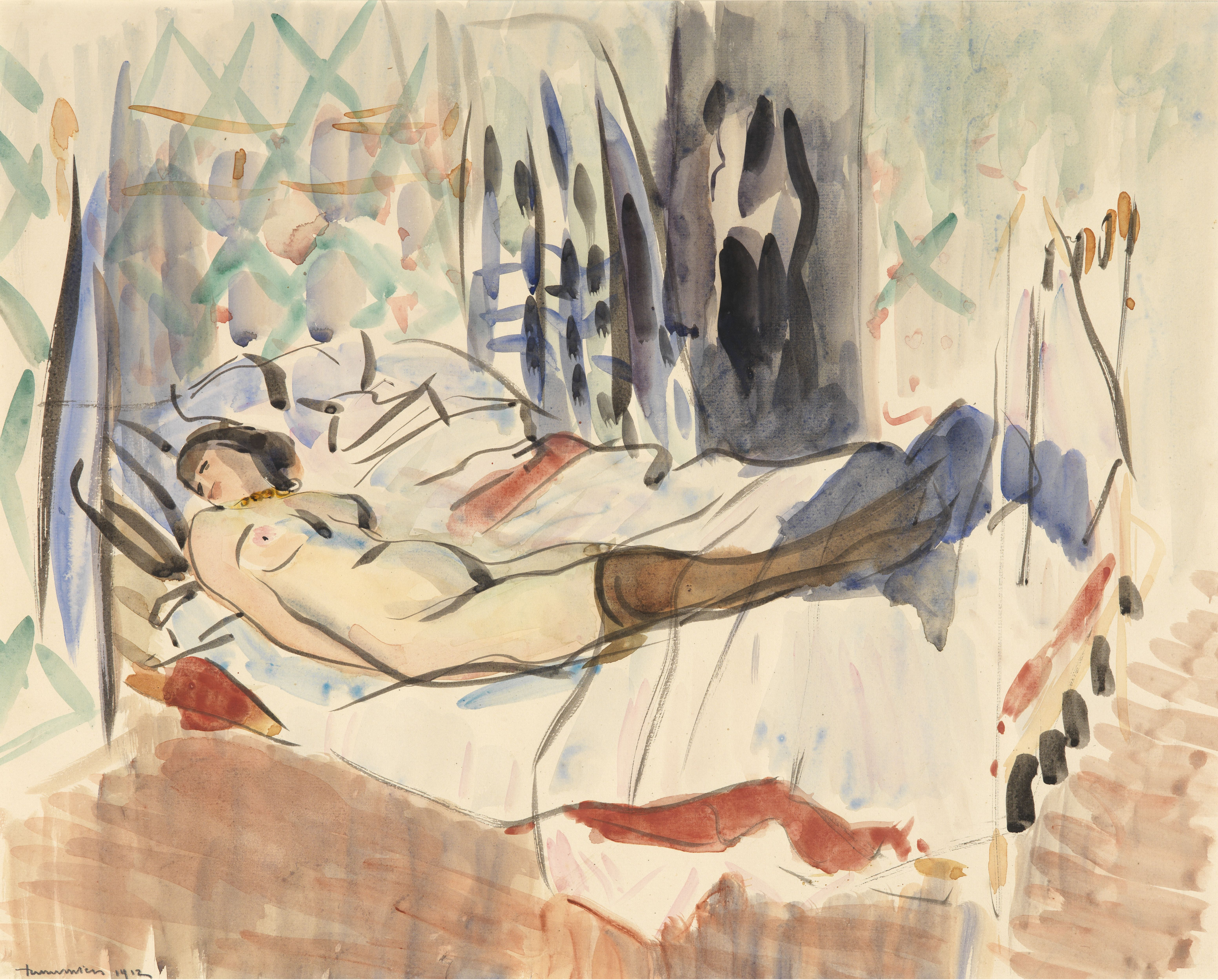

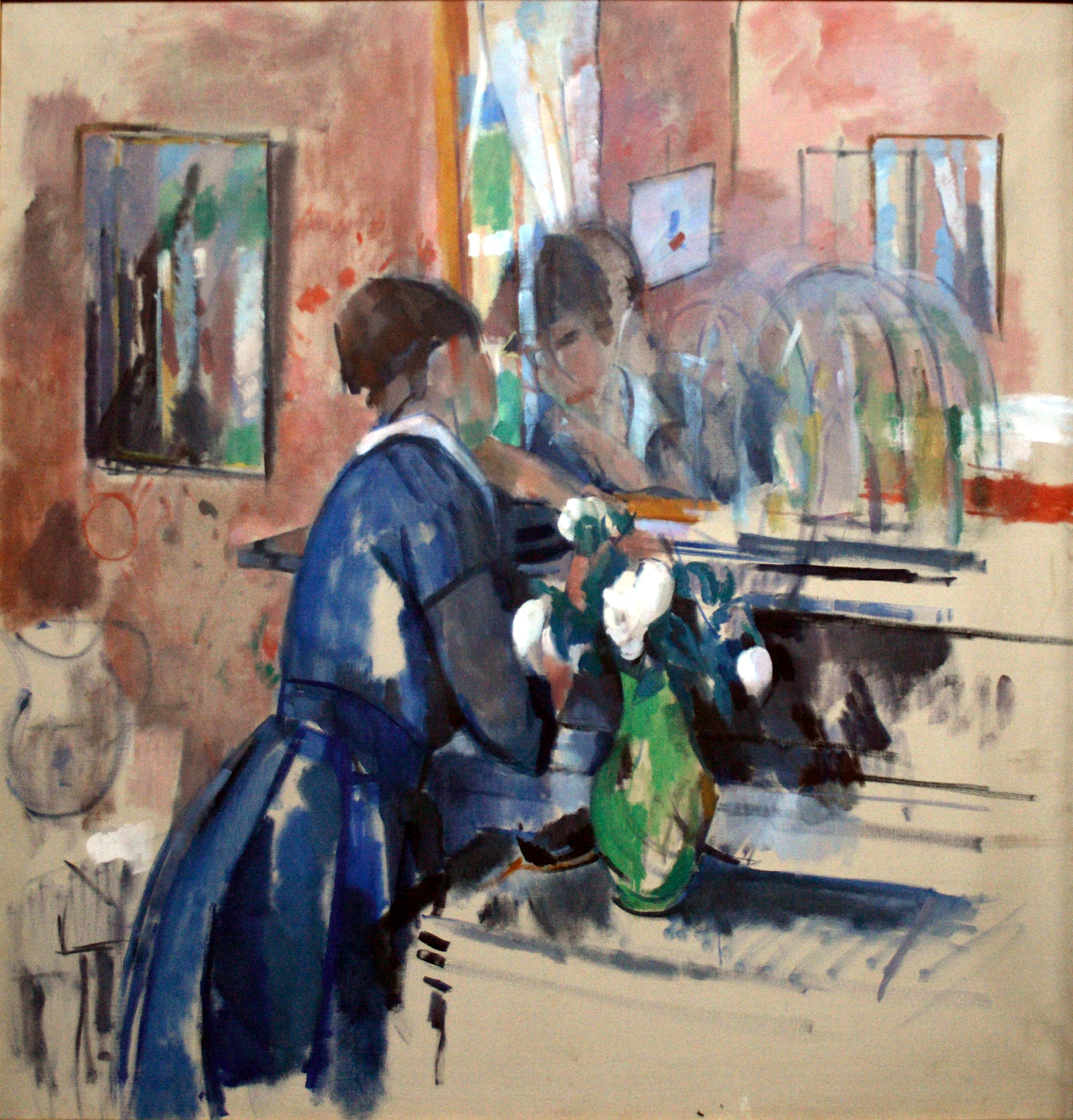
Lady in Blue in front of a Mirror (1914)

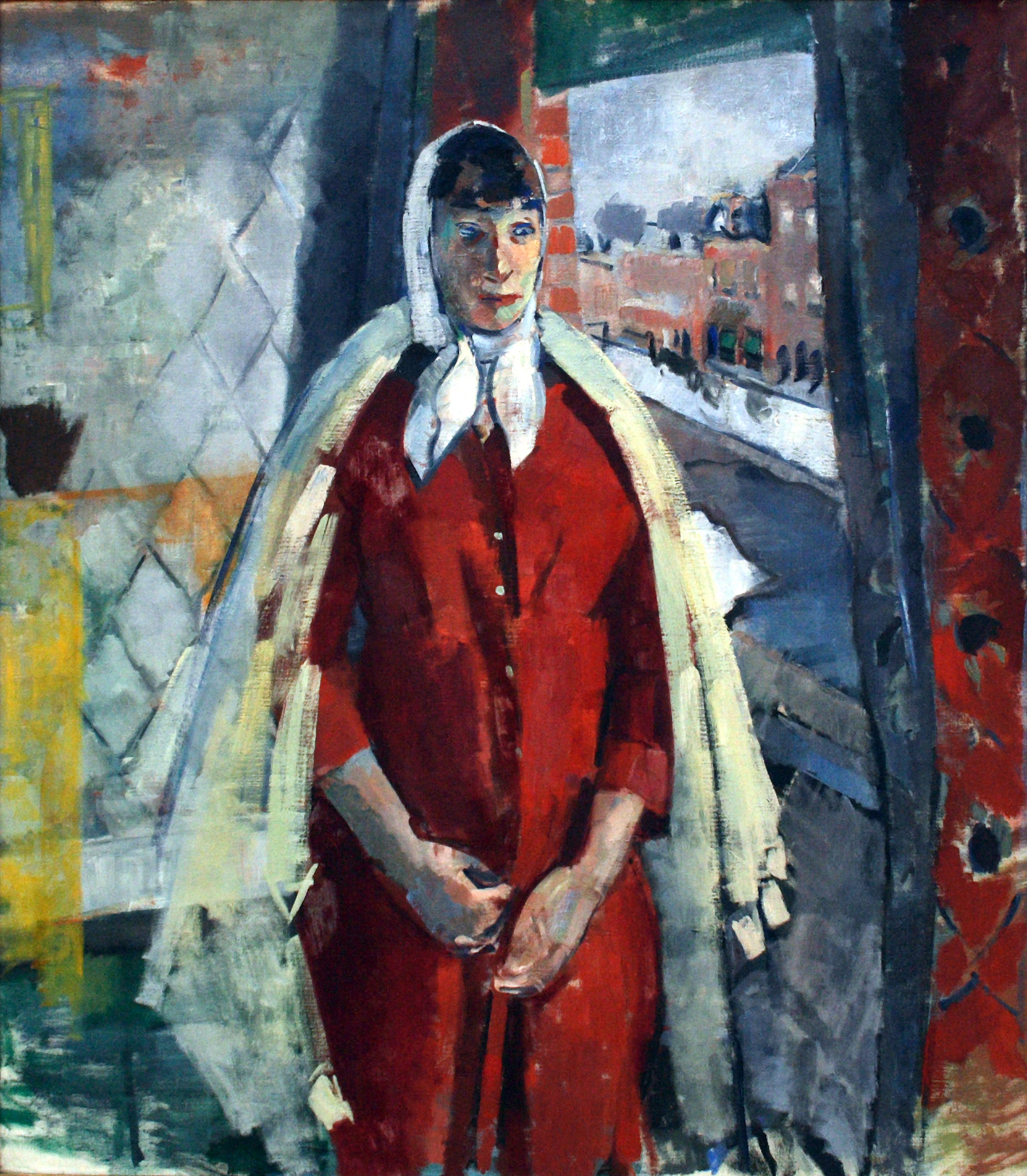
Woman at the Window (1915)

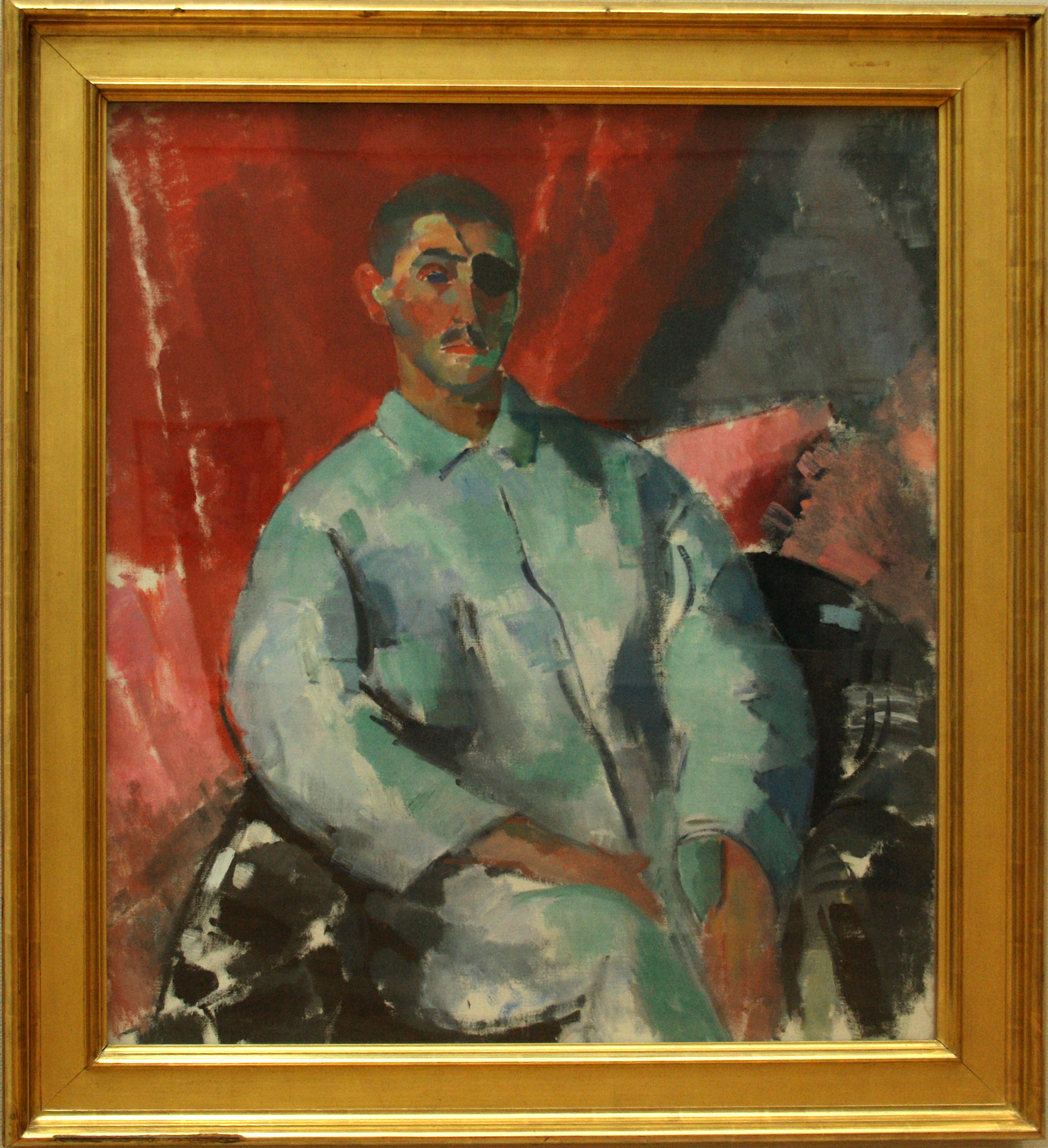
Self-Portrait in a Black Eyepatch (1915)
Paintings in the collection of The Phoebus Foundation, Antwerp

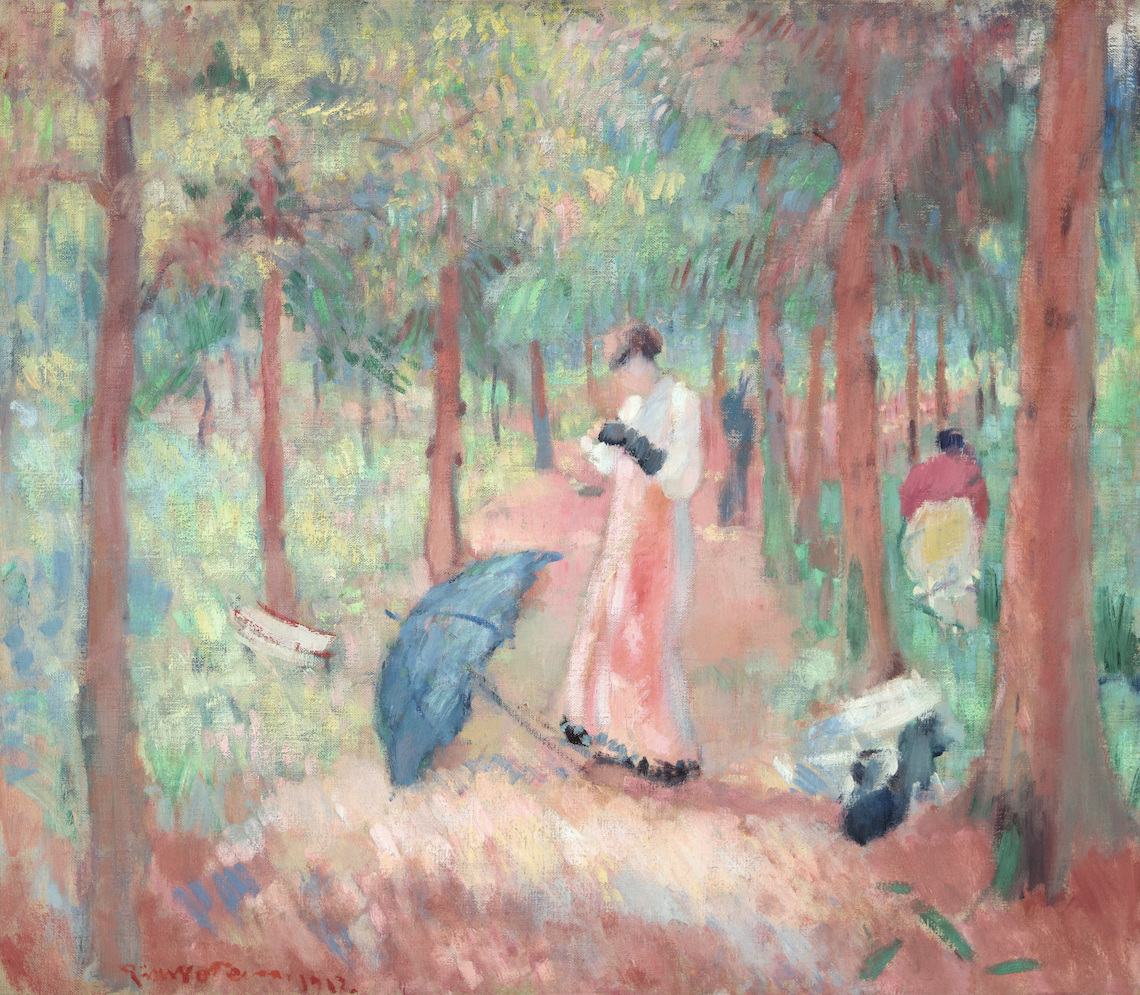
The pink avenue, 1912, The Phoebus Foundation

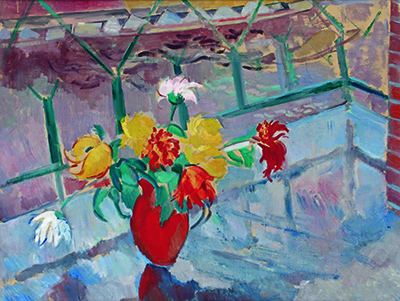
Chrysanthèmes, 1915, The Phoebus Foundation
