= The Mad Maiden (Rik Wouters) =

Sculpture by Rik Wouters

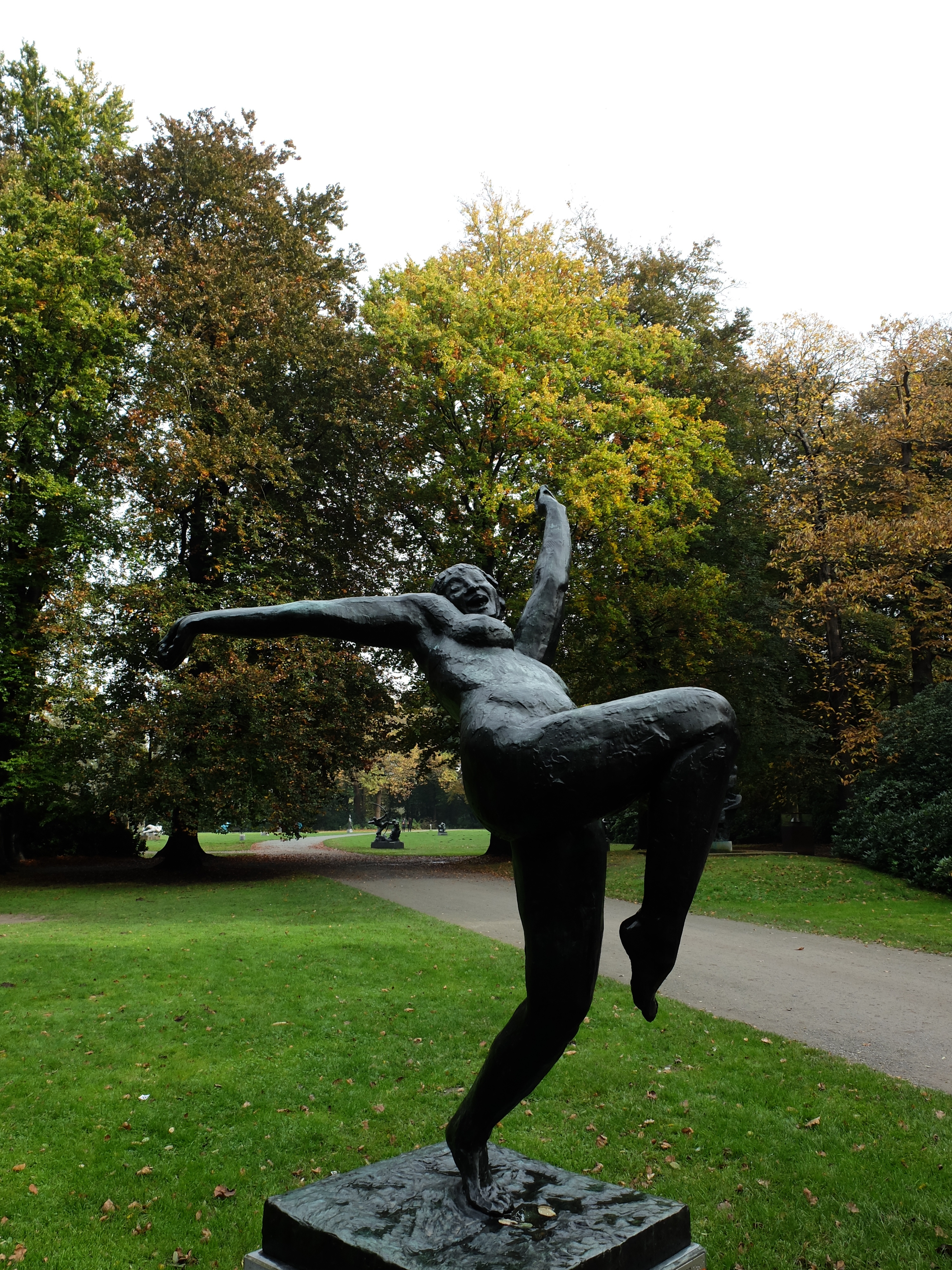
- Artist: Rik Wouters
- Year: 1912
- Medium: bronze
- Dimensions: 200 cm (79 in) × 120 cm (47 in) × 135 cm (53 in)
- Location: Middelheim Open Air Sculpture Museum, Belgium
- Coordinates: 51°10′53″N 4°24′51″E
- Accession No.: 1797, MID.LB.KM.1797

The Mad Maiden or The Mad Virgin (Dutch: Het zotte geweld or De dwaze maagd) is a bronze statue by the Belgian artist Rik Wouters, created in 1912.

The statue depicts Wouters' wife and muse, Nel Deurinckx, in a dynamic and ecstatic dancing pose. Wouters very often painted, drew and sculpted his wife in charming, everyday settings, while she was sleeping, reading, or doing domestic chores. The Mad Maiden is exceptional because it shows her in such an unusually carefree way. With this sensual sculpture, Wouters clearly distanced himself from the emotionlessness of academic art of his time.

Wouters became inspired for this sculpture when he and Nel visited a 1907 performance by the American modern dance pioneer Isadora Duncan in the Muntschouwburg in Brussels.

Several copies of the sculpture were made, also after the artist's early death in 1916. Casts of the sculpture are part of the following art collections:

- Middelheimmuseum, Antwerp, Belgium (on loan from the Royal Museum of Fine Art Antwerp)
- Belfius Art Collection, Brussels, Belgium
- Musée d'Ixelles, Brussels, Belgium
- Le Musée en Plein Air du Sart-Tilman, Liège, Belgium

The statue is a central motif in Joris Vermassen's graphic novel 'Het Zotte Geweld'.

== Bibliography ==
- Bernard Dewulf, "De feesttooi van het licht. Over Rik Wouters", in: Bijlichtingen. Kijken naar schilders, Uitgeverij Atlas, 2001
- Peter Theunynck en Lies Van Gasse, Nel, een zot geweld, Uitgeverij Wereldbibliotheek, 2016
