= Yasuo Mizui =

Japanese stone sculptor (1925–2008)

- Born: 3 May 1925; Kyoto, Japan
- Died: 3 September 2008 (aged 83); Apt, France
- Education: Kobe University; Tokyo University of the Arts; École des Beaux-Arts
- Known for: Stone sculpture Metagraphie
- Notable work: Walls of Fossiles Japan; Macrocosme and Microcosme France; Key of Love Germany; Echo of laugh US etc.
- Awards: Ordre des Arts et des Lettres 1985 Commandeur
- Website: Official website

Yasuo Mizui (水井 康雄, Mizui Yasuo; 30 May 1925 – 3 September 2008) was a Japanese stone sculptor who lived in France. He specialized in abstract art forms for public sculpture, often within architectural contexts, and participated in several sculpture symposia across Europe, the United States, Israel, and Japan.

== Biography ==
Yasuo Mizui was born in Kyoto, Japan, on 30 May 1925. He attended the Kyoto Daiichi Industrial High School, graduating in 1944. He enrolled at Kobe University and majored in mechanical engineering after graduating from high school. During World War II, he worked as a technician at a company in Hyogo, Japan, where he learned casting. After graduating in 1947, he entered the Tokyo University of the Arts, majoring in sculpture. He studied under Kazuo Kikuchi and Hirakushi Denchū. Mizui shifted his focus from mechanical engineering to sculpture because he believed in the transformative power of art—something without borders or conflicts. For his thesis, he chose the topic Art Casting – Casting Daibutsu. (Note: Mizui 2003, p. 126.)

After graduating from the Tokyo University of the Arts in 1953, Yasuo Mizui received a scholarship from the French government to continue his studies at the École des Beaux-Arts in Paris, France, from 1953 to 1958. There, he studied monumental art and sculpture under Alfred Janniot and Marcel Gimond. From 1954 to 1958, he apprenticed under Apel·les Fenosa while pursuing his studies.

During his apprenticeship, Fenosa instructed Mizui to create one clay sculpture each day upon his arrival at the atelier. After several months, Mizui felt despair over his perceived lack of creativity. However, he managed to complete a piece at the last moment, an experience that profoundly shaped his artistic journey. This period of growth prepared him for participation in the International Sculpture Symposium and the creation of large monumental works under France's 1% for Art program. Mizui graduated from École des Beaux-Arts in 1958.

In the 1950s, many Parisian artists chose to establish their workshops in Provence. The New York painter Bernard Pfriem opened an art school to bring American students to the center of Lacoste, France. This school was located in a large house next to the ancient castle of the Marquis de Sade. Mizui maintained a relationship with the school for 20 years, teaching stone sculpture to students every summer and creating a new piece of work with them each year.

== 1% for art ==
Many of Yasuo Mizui's works in France were created under the 1% for art program. During the 14 years between 1968 and 1982, Mizui completed 26 sculptures. His first commission from the French Ministry of Culture came in 1968, for which he created Jet d'eau pétrifiée, a stone sculpture measuring 3.2 x 8.0 x 8.0 meters, at the University of Bordeaux's Department of Law. He was chosen to create the piece after his work at the Grenoble Olympic Games.

Another notable piece, Le Mur qui s'ouvre, was completed in 1972. This cement retaining wall, measuring 4.5 × 13 x 1.4 m, is located at Lycée Louis Bascan in Rambouillet. For this work, Mizui employed a unique technique derived from his engineering background, using molds made from expanded polyester material cut with electrical resistance.

== Works ==
=== Olympic games ===
Mizui created the sculptural wall Les Murs des Fossiles for the 1964 Summer Olympics in Tokyo and Microcosme et Macrocosme for the 1968 Winter Olympics in Grenoble, France.

==== Les Murs des Fossiles ====
Les Murs des Fossiles is a granite relief wall (2 x 93 x 0.3 m) created for the Yoyogi National Gymnasium. In February 1964, Mizui was commissioned to create the artwork. He, along with ten assistants, worked on the project for three months on Kitagi Island in Okayama, Japan. The completed pieces were delivered to Tokyo in August 1964, and the wall was introduced to the public in September.

The abstract wall spans a total length of 93 m and consists of 408 mikage (a type of granite that is quarried in Japan) stone blocks, each measuring 1.82 x 0.6 x 0.3 m, with a combined weight of 160 tons. These stones, sourced from Kitagi Island, were hand-carved by Mizui using chisels and both large and small hammers.

The concept of Les Murs des Fossiles reflects ten "landscapes" inspired by Mizui's deep connection to life and nature, resembling fossilized memories: Travel, Flame, Weight, Perfume, Obsession, Water, Wisdom, Sound, Time, and Light.

==== Macrocosme et Microcosme ====
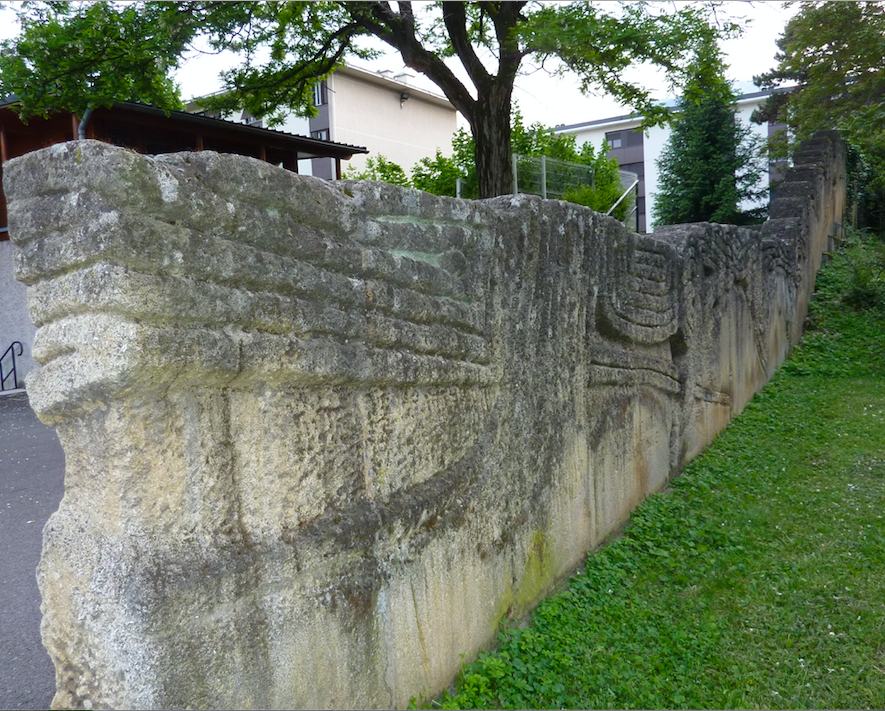

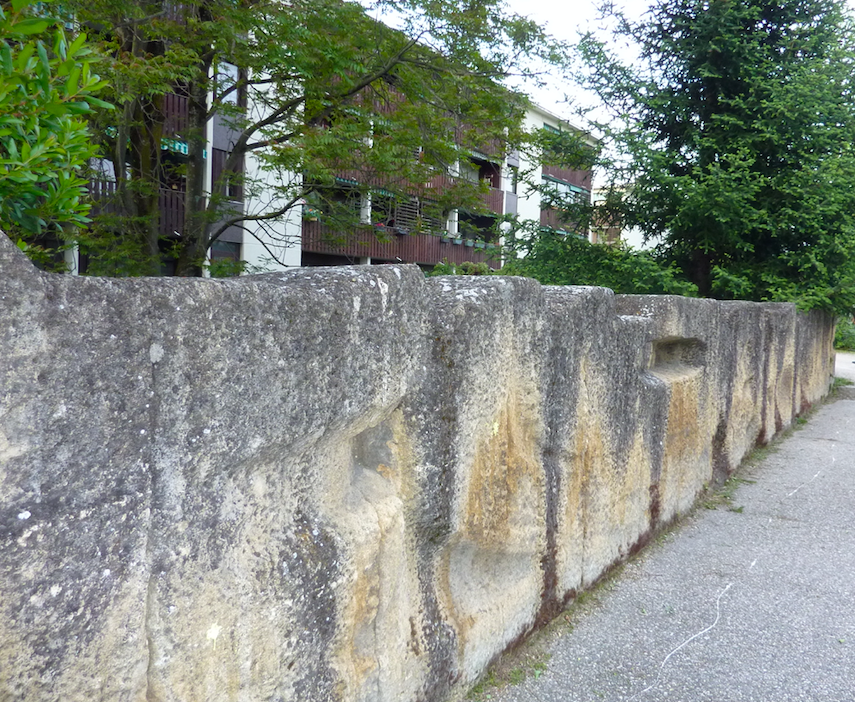
Macrocosme et Microcosme at the Olympic village in Grenoble, France

Macrocosme et Microcosme is a stone relief measuring 13 x 81 x 0.4 m, created for the Olympic Village in Grenoble. The work consists of two 40-meter-long walls, representing the dual concepts of macrocosm and microcosm.

The macrocosm symbolizes the vastness and vitality of nature transcending individual existence, while the microcosm reflects the inner conflicts and struggles of human beings. Together, these walls explore the relationship between the natural world and human existence.

Tadao Takemoto, translator of André Malraux's Anti-Retrospective (Shincho Sha, Japan, 1977), often mentioned Mizui in his writings. During the creation of the artwork, André Malraux, who served as the French Minister of Cultural Affairs under Charles de Gaulle and was known for his profound appreciation of art, visited the Olympic Village. Upon seeing Mizui's work, Malraux praised it, exclaiming, "Excellent!"

=== Diagonal Yin Yang ===
At the age of 70, Mizui conceptualized Diagonal Yin and Yang as a division between Japan and France—two paths, two incomplete cultures. He contemplated the duality between these extremes in his sculptural work, where he felt caught between the hammer and the anvil. He saw these two opposing yet coexisting forces influencing his art, identifying Japan as yin and France as yang. This interplay of contrasts reflected the dynamic relationship between the two cultures.

Mizui described this dialogue as a continuous interaction between yin and yang, where opposition, answers, and mutual embrace emerge through his sculptural expression. For him, elements like rivers, houses, or feminine forms embodied yin, while flowers, trees, animals, and masculine forms symbolized yang. He constantly questioned the balance of these forces in his work, stating, "The response looks like a masked play between truth and falsehood."

Diagonal Yin Yang is a series of 40 stone sculptures created in Japan for an exhibition at Gallery Tatuno Hiranomachi in Osaka in 1965. Following the exhibition, all the sculptures were transferred to France and displayed in the garden of Mizui's residence in Lacoste. In 2013, two of the statues were gifted as part of an exhibition held in Luxeuil-les-Bains.

=== Le mur de l'espoir ===
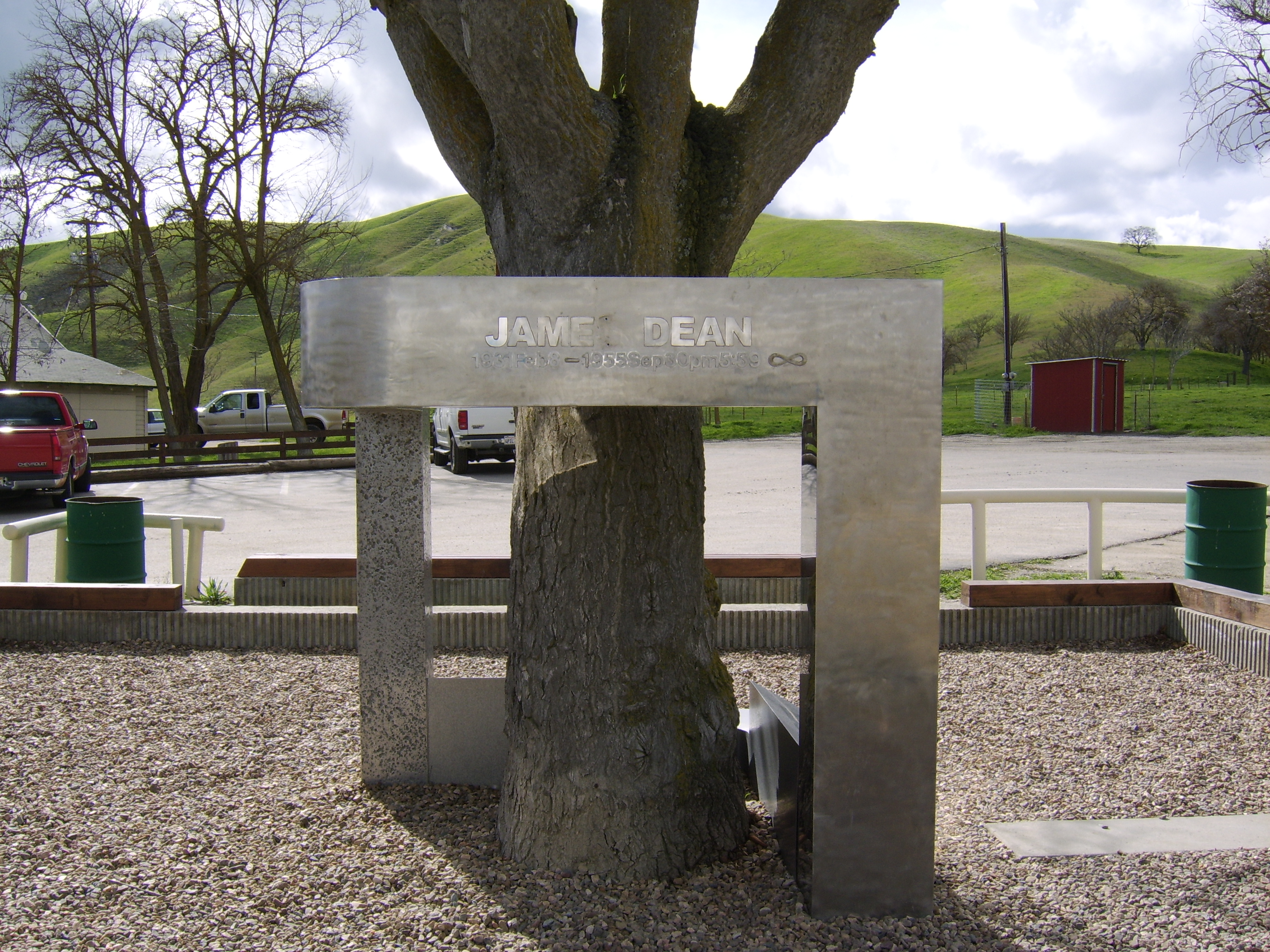
Chromium cenotaph for James Dean in Cholame, California

In 1981, Mizui created a chromium cenotaph for James Dean, commissioned by Seita Onishi, near the location of James Dean's fatal car accident. In 1985, Mizui set out to create the James Dean Center in Cholame, California, with Onishi. Mizui worked on the James Dean Center project for three years, creating sketches and sculptures, as well as visiting the United States. However, due to a conflict of opinion with the owner of the proposed site, the project could not be completed.

Despite this, the Le mur de l'espoir (limestone, 13 x 4.5 x 1.2 m), which was intended to be on display at the James Dean Center, was dedicated to the memory of James Dean. This sculpture took Mizui three years to complete and consists of 150 tons of stone extracted from the quarry in Lacoste, the village where Mizui lived. On one side of the Le mur de l'espoir, Mizui sculpted the face of James Dean. The Le mur de l'espoir was inaugurated in 2006, 51 years after James Dean's death. Although not in California, it now welcomes visitors to the garden of Mizui's residence in Lacoste, serving as an open-air museum.

=== Métagraphie ===
The technique, known as métagraphie, is obtained through a non-reproducible process. The artist applies watercolor to waterproof paper, then allows the materials to interact and evolve naturally. Mizui's response to this process is to find the right balance between the fluidity of the watercolor and the exposure time. While similar techniques such as pressed oil, starch-pressed, and decal exist, Mizui's approach and choice of materials are distinct.

In 1984, international fine arts critic Sakae Hasegawa commented:

When I saw this painting for the first time, I thought it was a picture of a snowy mountain. But upon closer inspection, I realized it was not a picture at all. This image resonated deeply within me, evoking a cold silence. I find that this painting conveys a philosophical and meditative openness, as if the artist has allowed the silence of the heart to emerge.

=== Four completed forms ===
==== Oscillation ====
The Oscillo-Relief cut is a shape created through the vertical oscillatory motion and horizontal oscillation of an electrical resistance. This free form does not result from a prior plan, but the technique requires precise control. Oscillo-Relief is an invention of Mizui, which he first applied to his sculptures in 1972.

In 1981, Mizui was invited to participate in the 2nd Henry Moore Grand Prize Exhibition at the Hakone Open-Air Museum in Nagano Prefecture, Japan, where he created Oscillo-Complex, stone, 3 x 1.3 x 1.2 m, and received a Special Prize at the exhibition.

This set also includes:

- Oscillo-tower, stone, 2.0 x 0.6 x 0.6 m (July 1972)
- Oscillo-Cascade I, stone, 2.0 x 6.0 x 1.0 m (November 1975) located at SCAD Lacoste
- Oscillo-arch, stone, 1.5 x 4.0 x 0.4 m (July 1976) located at SCAD Lacoste
- Oscillo-escalier, stone, 2.0 x 6.0 x 2.3 m (May 1977) located at Villeneuve d'Ascq
- Oscillo-element, stone, 2.0 x 1.0 x 1.0 m (July 1977) located at SCAD Lacoste
- Oscillo-Cascade II, stone, 3.0 x 12.0 x 3.5 m (October 1977) located at University of Nancy
- Oscillo-Crêtes, stone, 2.4 x 7.5 x 1.8 m (May 1981) located at École du Service de Santé des Armés de Bron, Lyon
- Oscillo-complex II, marble, 2.0 x 0.8 x 0.7 m (April 1986) located at Sapporo Sculpture Park, Hokkaido

==== The Wall Sculpture (1964) ====
Cosmos, stone, 15 x 18 x 0.06 m, 1970 located at Lycée Louis Armand in Villefranche-sur-Saône, consists of 360 flagstones from Comblanchien, each 6 cm thick, firmly fixed to the wall. Mizui stated, "I wanted to create a shadow, graphics, and light evoking heaven, earth, and man." This sculpture recalls to Les Murs des Fossiles and Macrocosme et Microcosme.

==== Hommage à Néguev (1960–1971) ====
Hommage à Néguev, marble, 3.7 x 1.7 x 0.6 m, (1962) located at Mitzpe Ramon, Israel, was created during a symposium in Israel. Reflecting on this experience, the artist expressed:

It was a real brainwashing experience for two months in the Negev Desert. I felt my sculpture as a drop in the sea, immersed in the immensity of nature. This was the first time I could hold a chisel with sincere humility. When I made an elliptical hole in the top part, I felt that sunlight was rising towards me.

==== ZIG and ZAG ====
ZIG and ZAG was created after Mizui first worked with blocks of polystyrene, cutting them to visualize the final shape of the sculpture. He directed dozens of works using this technique.

The set includes:

- Zig et Zag I, stone, 2 x 0.4 x 0.4 m (July 1973), located at Savannah College of Art and Design
- Zig et Zag IV, stone, 0.8 x 0.25 x 0.25 m (December 1974)
- Zig et Zag 2 pieces, stone, 1.0 x 0.6 x 0.6 m (July 1975)
- Zig Zag, stone, 2.0 x 0.4 x 0.4 m (September 1996)

Additional works
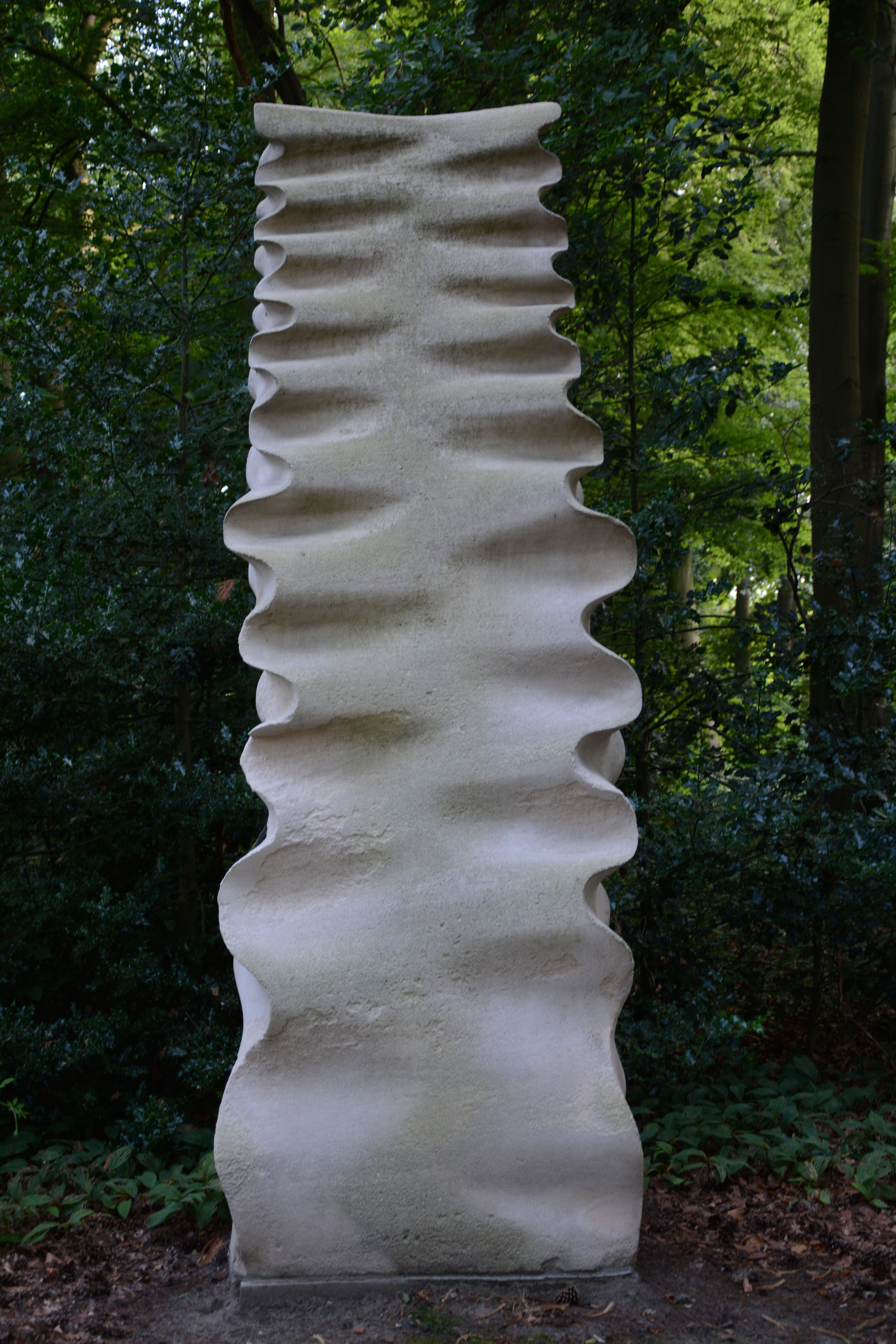
Fumée blanche, stone, 3.1 x 1.1 x 0.9 meters (May 1975) Middelheim Open Air Sculpture Museum in Antwerp, Belgium

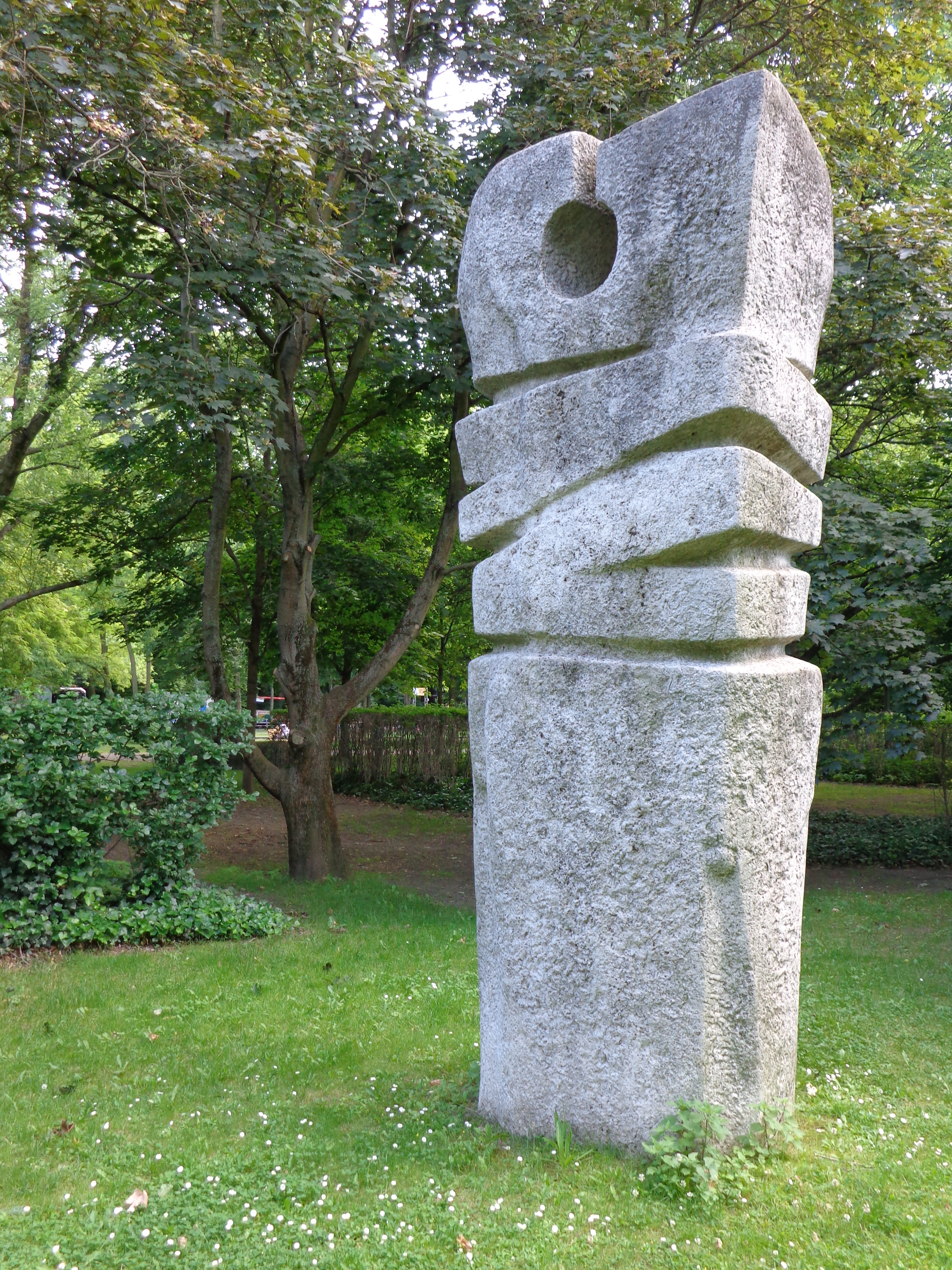
Clef d'amour, stone, 4.0 x 0.9 x 0.6 meters (May 1962) in Berlin, Germany

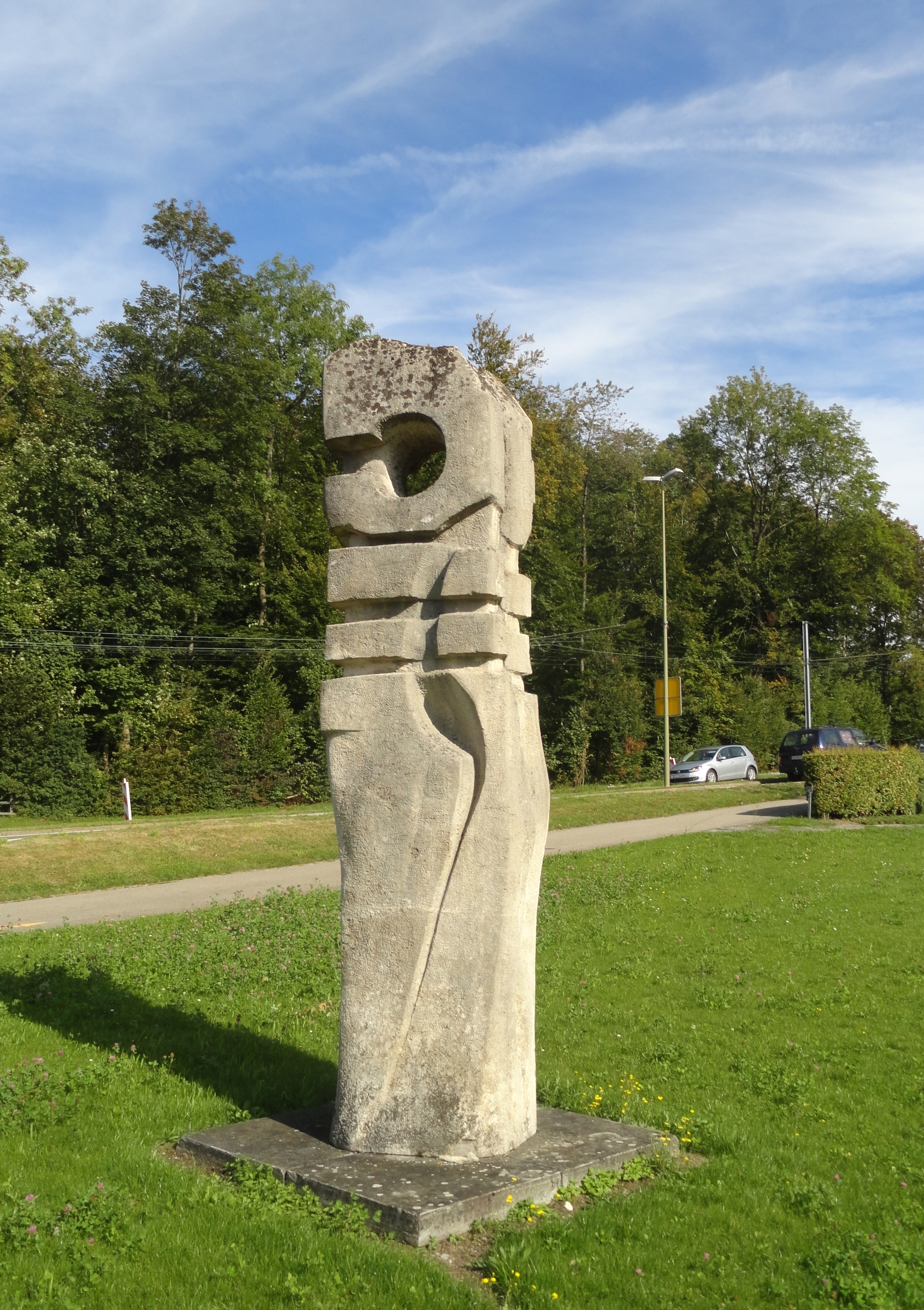
Clef au ciel, stone, 3.8 x 0.8 x 0.85 meters (1960) Made in St. Margarethen Germany, then, moved to Zollikon, Zurich, Switzerland.

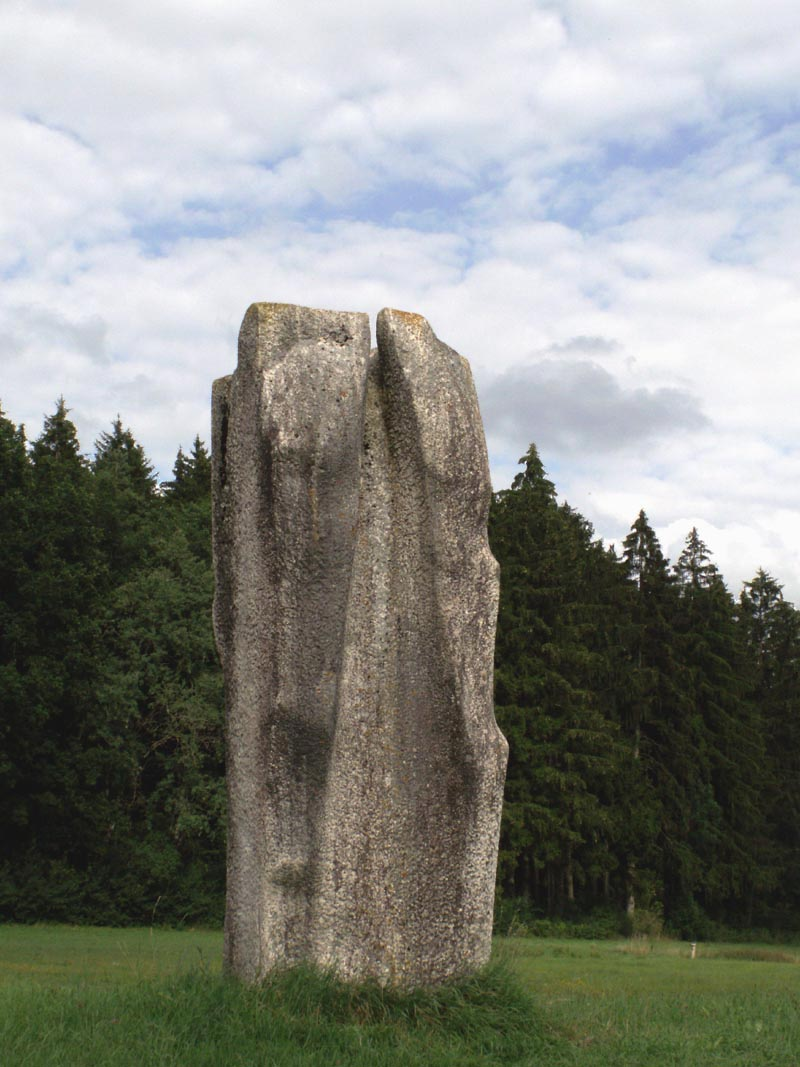
Cascade de la lumiére, stone, 4.3 x 0.9 x 1.0 meters Oggelshausen, Germany created at the International Sculpture Symposium in May 1969

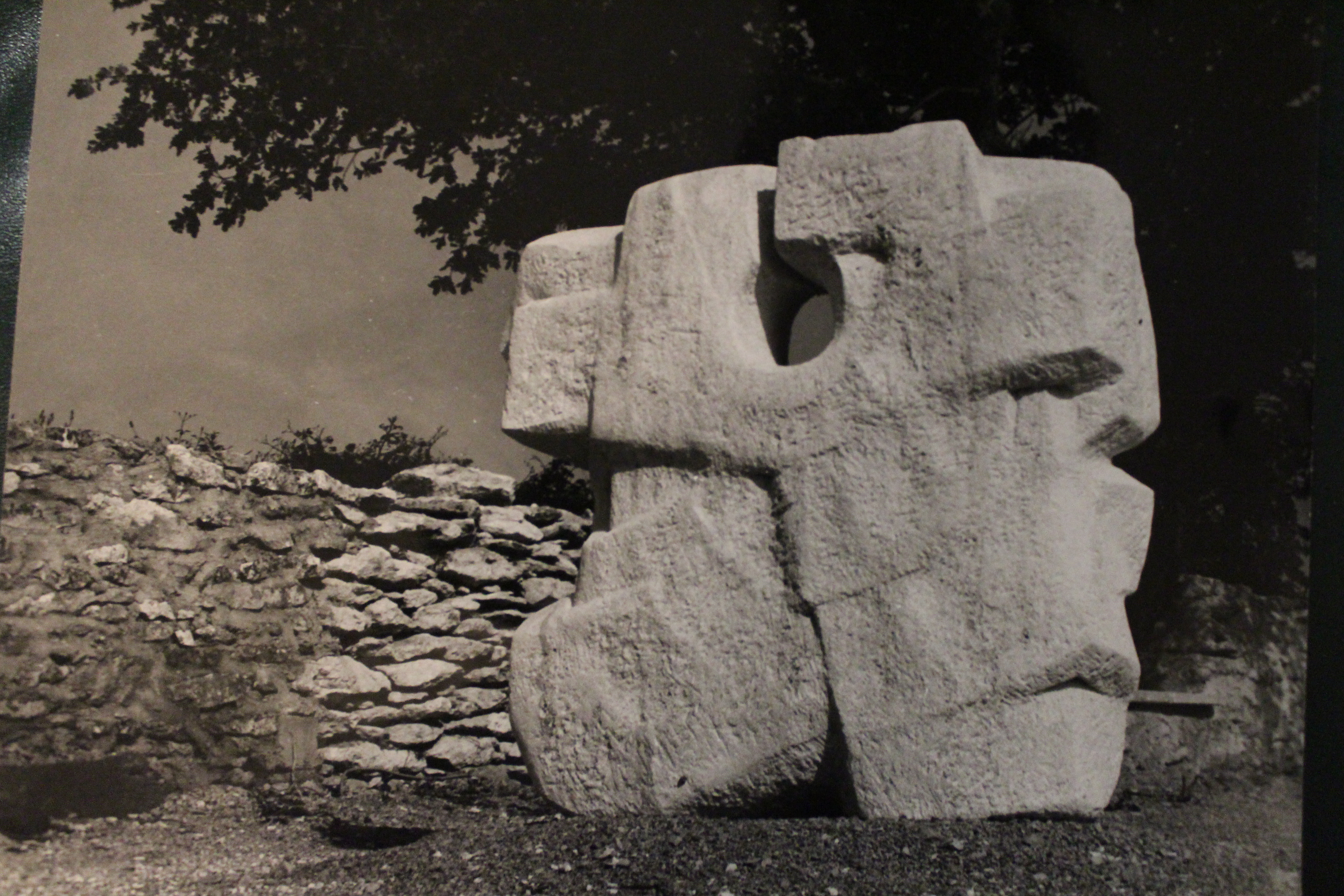
Caprice de Luberon, marble, located at Palm Springs International Airport in California, U.S.
This selection of works is based on Mizui's 50 ans de Sculpture. (Note: Mizui 2003, pp. 116–123.)

== Selected symposia and exhibitions ==
Mizui participated in many symposia throughout his life. The sculpture symposium provided Yasuo Mizui with a new direction, allowing him to develop and promote a sense of sculptural monumentality within urban aesthetics. It also fostered competition among artists, challenging him to demonstrate his ability to work with the same material. Mizui first discovered the allure of working with large stone blocks, some as tall as 4 m, at a symposium in Austria in 1960. In 1962, he created Clef d'amour, a stone sculpture measuring 4 x 0.9 x 0.6 m, near the Berlin Wall in Germany. The symposium had a symbolic slogan: "The wall to the east, creating a sculpture to the west." This event was awarded the German Critics' Prize. Reflecting on the experience, Mizui stated, “There is a wall between east and west. That wall creates a sad story every day. Our silent anger fueled this meeting.” The location of the sculpture was later moved, and it is now displayed at Berlin Square in Germany.

- 1959, Participated Biennale de Paris France, awarded A. Susse individual prize from Tombeau des corbeaux (Bird cemetery)
- 1960, Participated in St. Margareten international symposium, created Clef au ciel (key to heaven)
- 1961, Participated in Sculpture Symposium Kaisersteinbruch in Kirchheim, Germany, created Borne III (Guide III)
- 1961, Participated in an International sculpture symposium in Portorož, Slovenia, Borne II (Guide II)
- 1962, Participated in Symposion Europäischer Bildhauer in Berlin, Germany, created Clef d'amour (Key to love)
- 1962, Participated in an International sculpture symposium in Mizpe Ramon (Neguev), Israel, created Hommage à Néguev (Tribute to Neguev)
- 1963, Participated in an International sculpture symposium in Manazuru, Kanagawa Japan, created Michinashi, stone, 2.0 x 1.0 x 0.9 m
- 1964, Created Les murs des fossils, Yoyogi National Gymnasium, in Tokyo, Japan
- 1966, Participated in an International Czhecoslovakian symposium in Vyšné Ružbachy, Slovakia, created Hommage à Tatra (To Tatra)
- 1967, Participated in the Olympiad Grenoble Symposium, in Grenoble, France, Macrocosme et Microcosme (Macrocosm and Microcosm), started 1% for art sculpture in France
- 1968, Participated Vermont International Sculpture Symposium, in Vermont, USA, created Trois Traces(Three traces)
- 1969, Participated Oggelshausen symposium in Oggelshausen, Germany, created Cascade de la lumieré (made first at Feedersee, then, moved to sculpture field in Oggelshausen)
- 1975, Participated 13th Biennale of sculpeture in Antwerp, Belgium, created Les Cretes II(Stone smoke II)
- 2007, Exhibition at Japanese consular in Marseille, France

=== Post-humous exhibitions ===
- 2011 Retrospective exhibition Yasuo Mizui at Horikawa Miike Gallery in Kyoto, Japan
- 2013 Retrospective exhibition Yasuo Mizui in Luxeruil-les-Bains (Haute-Saône), France
- 2014 Retrospective exhibition Yasuo Mizui in Lacoste, France
- 2015 Exposition retrospective Yasuo Mizui in Villeneuve-d'Ascq (Nord-Pas-de-Calais), France
- 2015–17 Installation of Le gardien des nuages in the garden of Chateau of La Celle, foundation Flag-France Renaissance, in Paris, France.
- 2018 April 4–28 Exposition Yasuo Mizui, sculpteur de l'âme in Wattrelos, France

== Awards ==
- 1959 A. Susse prize at 1st Biennale de Paris, France
- 1962 Awarded Deutscher Kritikerpreis for members who participated in 2nd Berlin Sculpture Symposium, Germany
- 1964 7th Takamura prize for sculpture, Japan
- 1981 Grand prix for 2nd Henry Moore exhibition in Hakone-open Air museum, Japan
- 1985 Ordre des Arts et des Lettres (commandeur) from Minister of Culture, France
