= Self-Portrait in a Black Eyepatch =

Painting by Rik Wouters

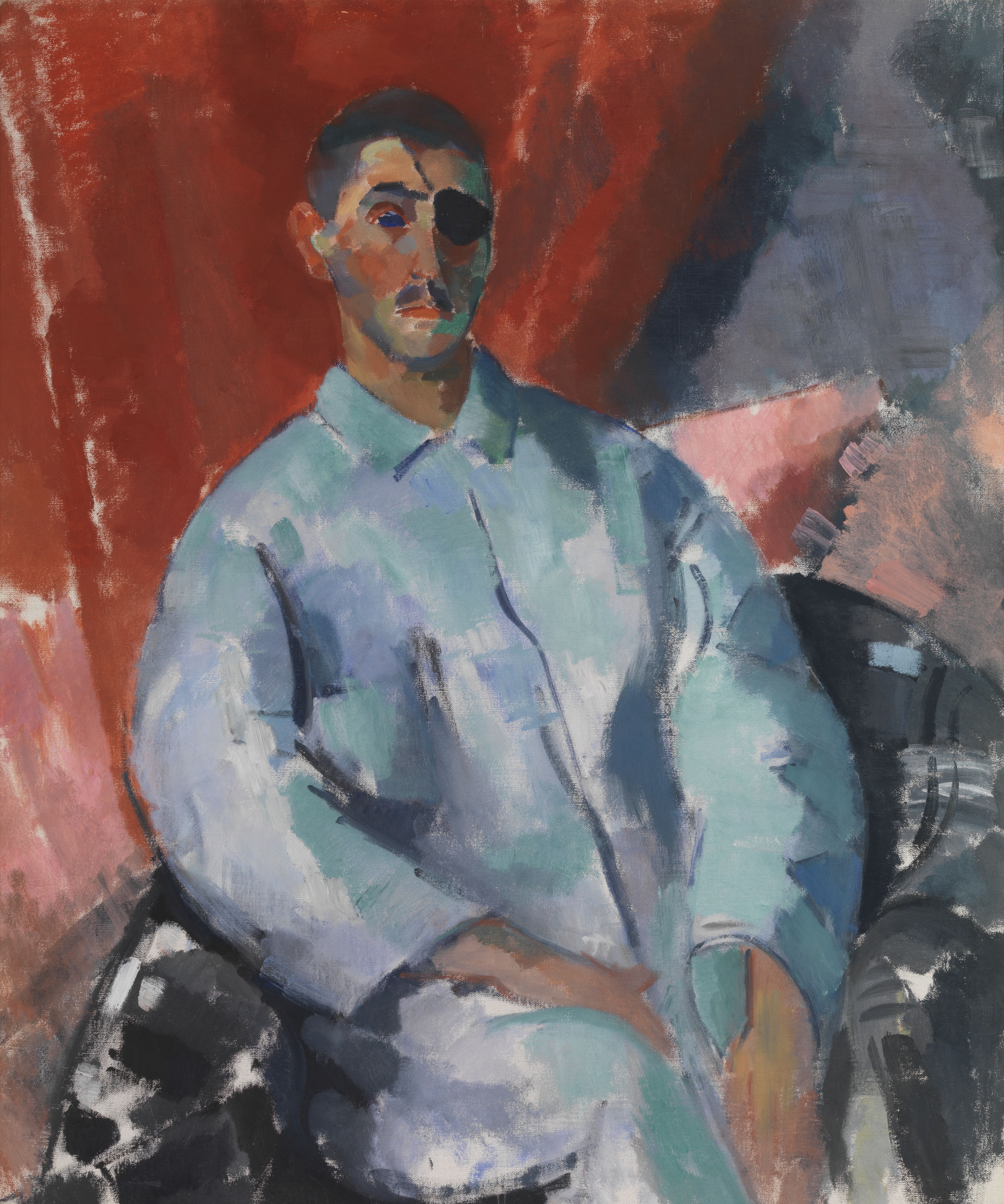
Self-Portrait in a Black Eyepatch (c. 1915) by Rik Wouters

Self-Portrait in a Black Eyepatch is an oil on canvas painting by the Belgian artist Rik Wouters, probably painted in 1915. It is now in the Royal Museum of Fine Arts, Antwerp.
