= Venus Victorious =

Sculpture by Pierre Auguste Renoir

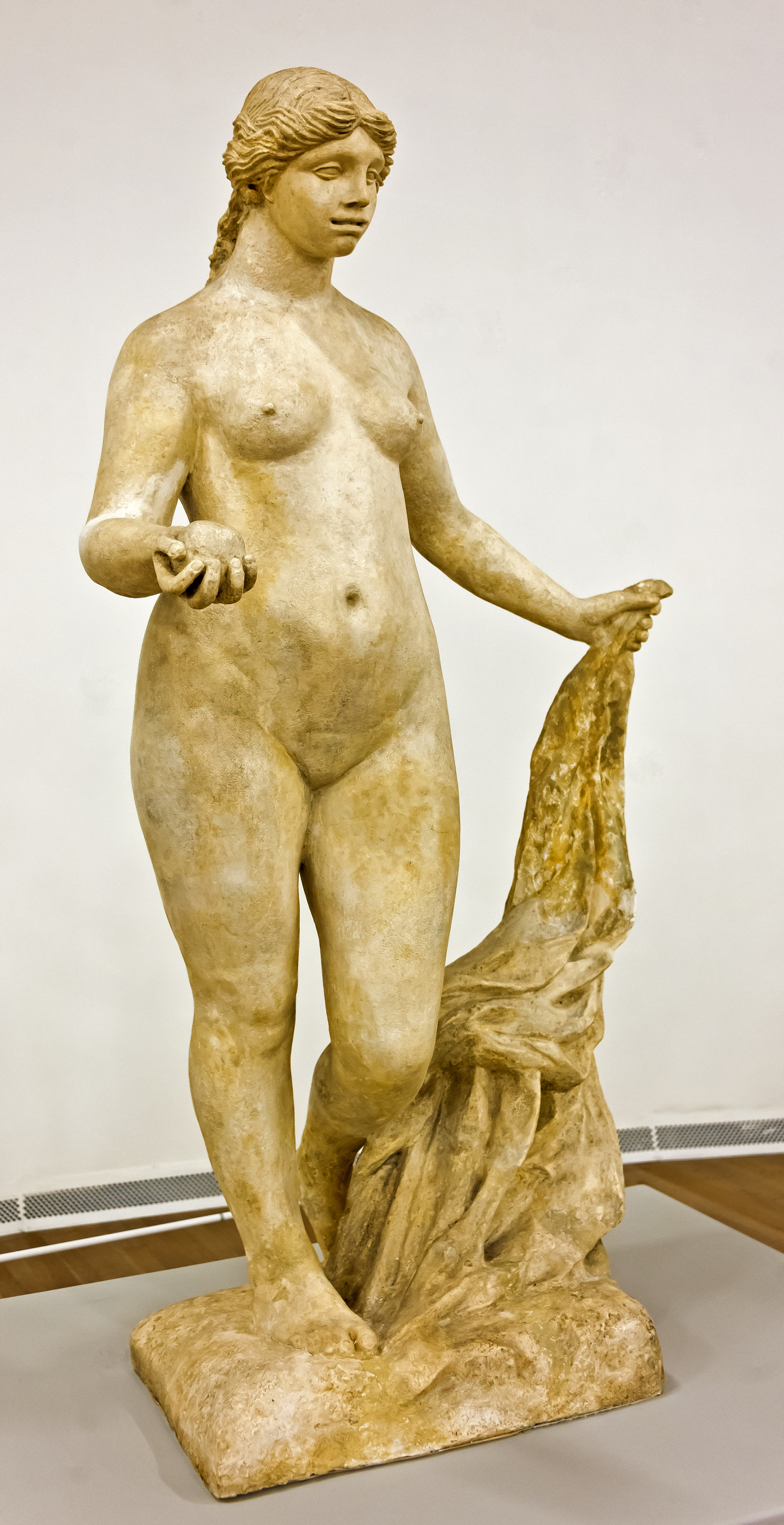
- Artist: Pierre-Auguste Renoir
- Year: c. 1914
- Medium: Plaster
- Dimensions: 191 cm (75 in)
- Weight: 151 kg
- Location: Museo Soumaya, Mexico City

Venus Victorious (French: Vénus victorieuse) or Venus Victrix is a c.1914 plaster sculpture of Venus by the French artist Pierre-Auguste Renoir, based on his image of the goddess in his painting The Judgement of Paris. It shows her holding the golden apple she has just won by being judged the most beautiful of three goddesses by Paris. It is now in the Museo Soumaya in Mexico City.

Renoir had advanced arthritis by the time he produced the work and so was assisted by the Catalan artist Richard Guino, recommended to him by Aristide Maillol. On Renoir's death, his family and Guino's family argued over who owned the sculpture, with the former winning out. When Paul Renoir moved to Canada he took the sculpture with him - on his death his widow sold it and the last painting ever painted by Renoir at auction. On 19 September 2013 it was auctioned again, this time by the Ukrainian Institute of America to the Carlos Slim Foundation, which passed it its current owners.

Bronze casts from the sculpture are now in Tate Britain and the New Orleans Museum of Art.
