= Art in the White House =

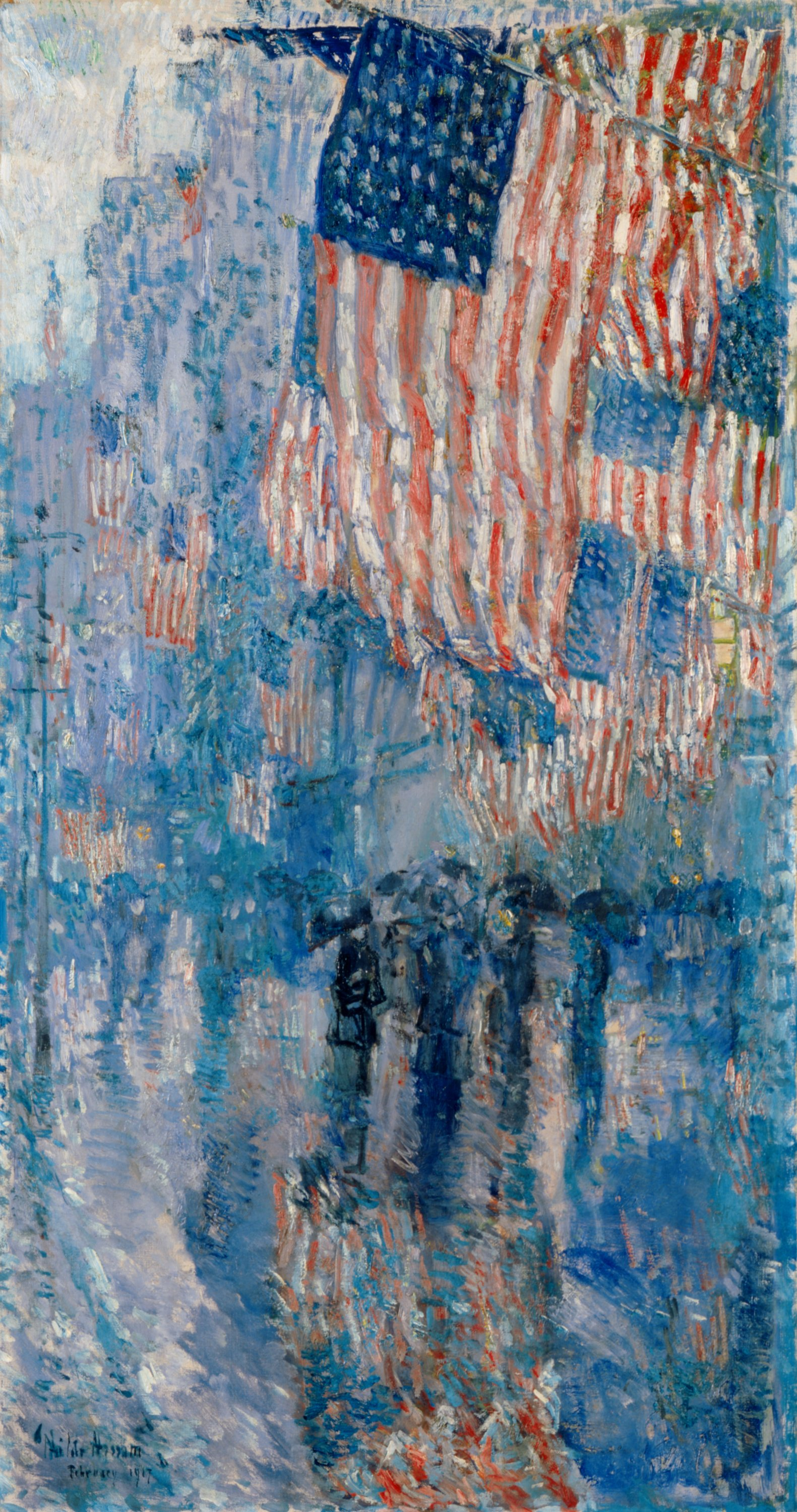
The Avenue in the Rain by Childe Hassam (1917), depicting Fifth Avenue in New York City, has hung in the Oval Office during Bill Clinton's, Barack Obama's, Donald Trump's and Joe Biden's administrations.

The White House's art collection, sometimes also called the White House Collection or Pride of the American Nation, has grown over time from donations from descendants of the Founding Fathers to commissions by established artists. It comprises paintings, sculptures, and other art forms. At times, the collection grows from a president's specific request, such as when Ronald Reagan began collecting the work of naval artist Tom Freeman in 1986, a tradition that continued through the Obama years.

== History ==
The White House's Art collection was established by an Act of Congress in 1961 and grew extensively during the Kennedy Administration. It now includes more than 65,000 objects if individual items are catalogued. As of 2021, there are more than 500 pieces on view under the care of the White House Curator and the White House Historical Association, and these are often complemented by those on loan from museums.

== Gallery ==
=== Official presidential and spousal portraits ===
Lansdowne Portrait of George Washington by Gilbert Stuart, 1796

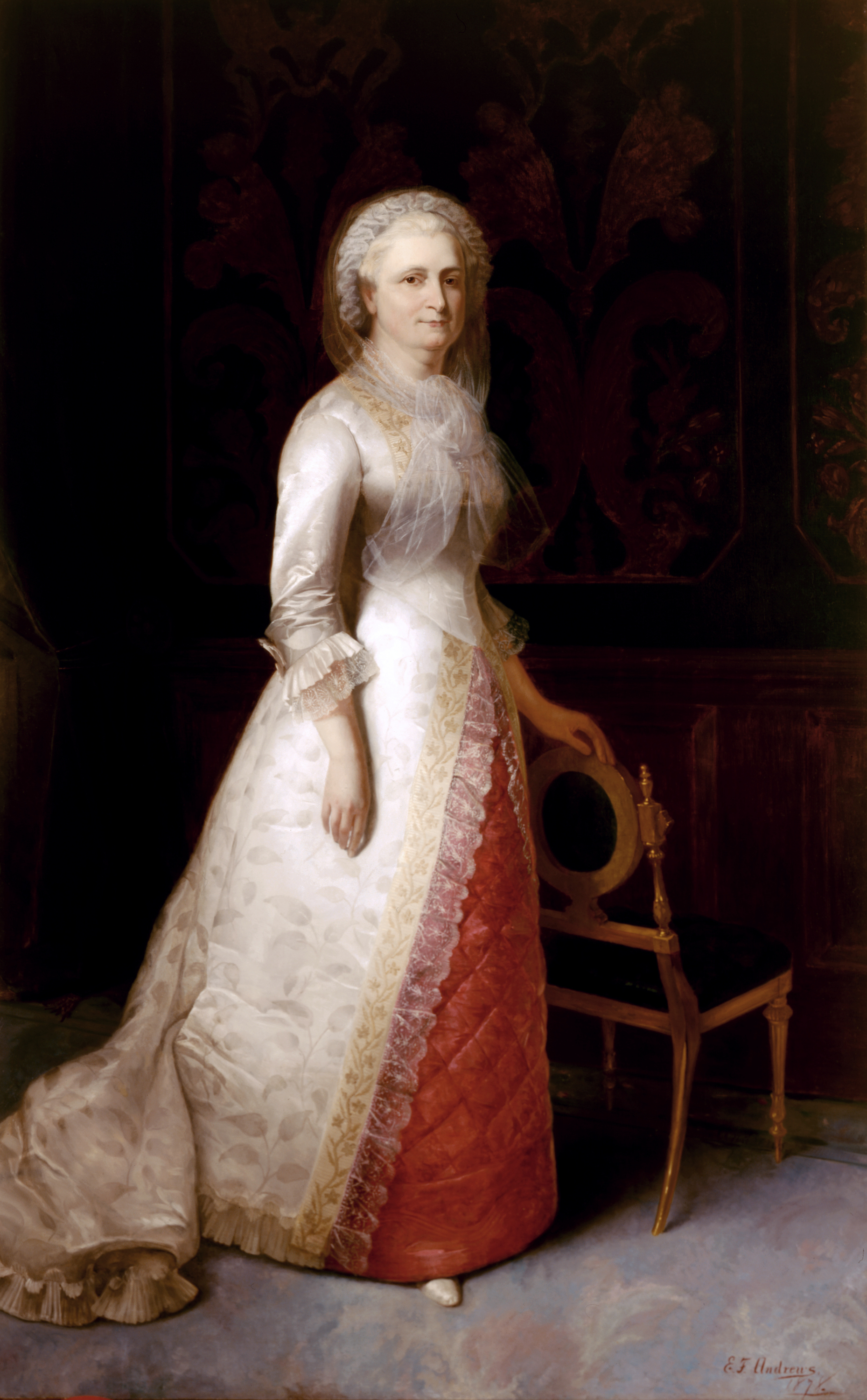
Portrait of Martha Washington by Eliphalet Frazer Andrews, 1878

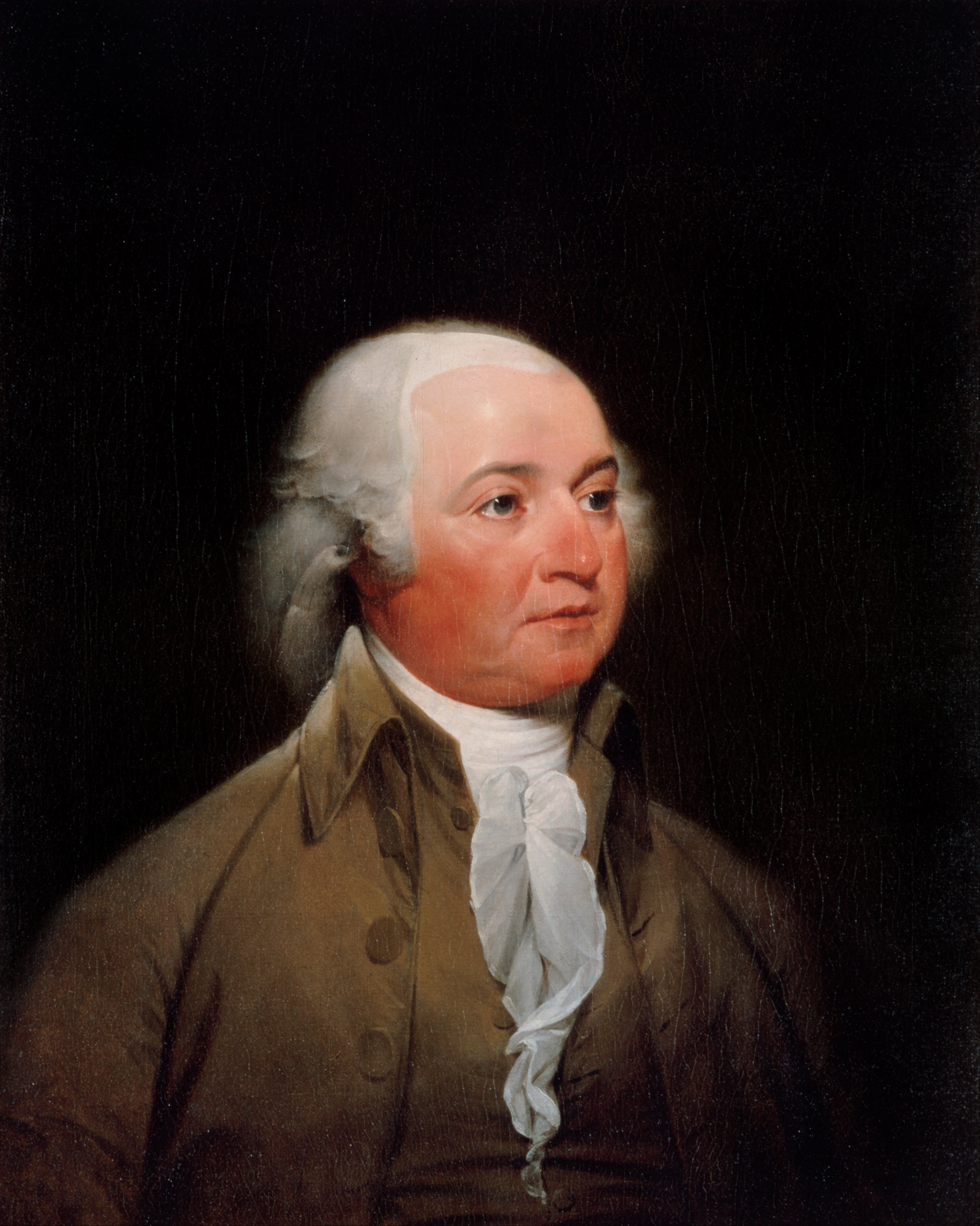
Portrait of John Adams by John Trumbull, c. 1792−1793

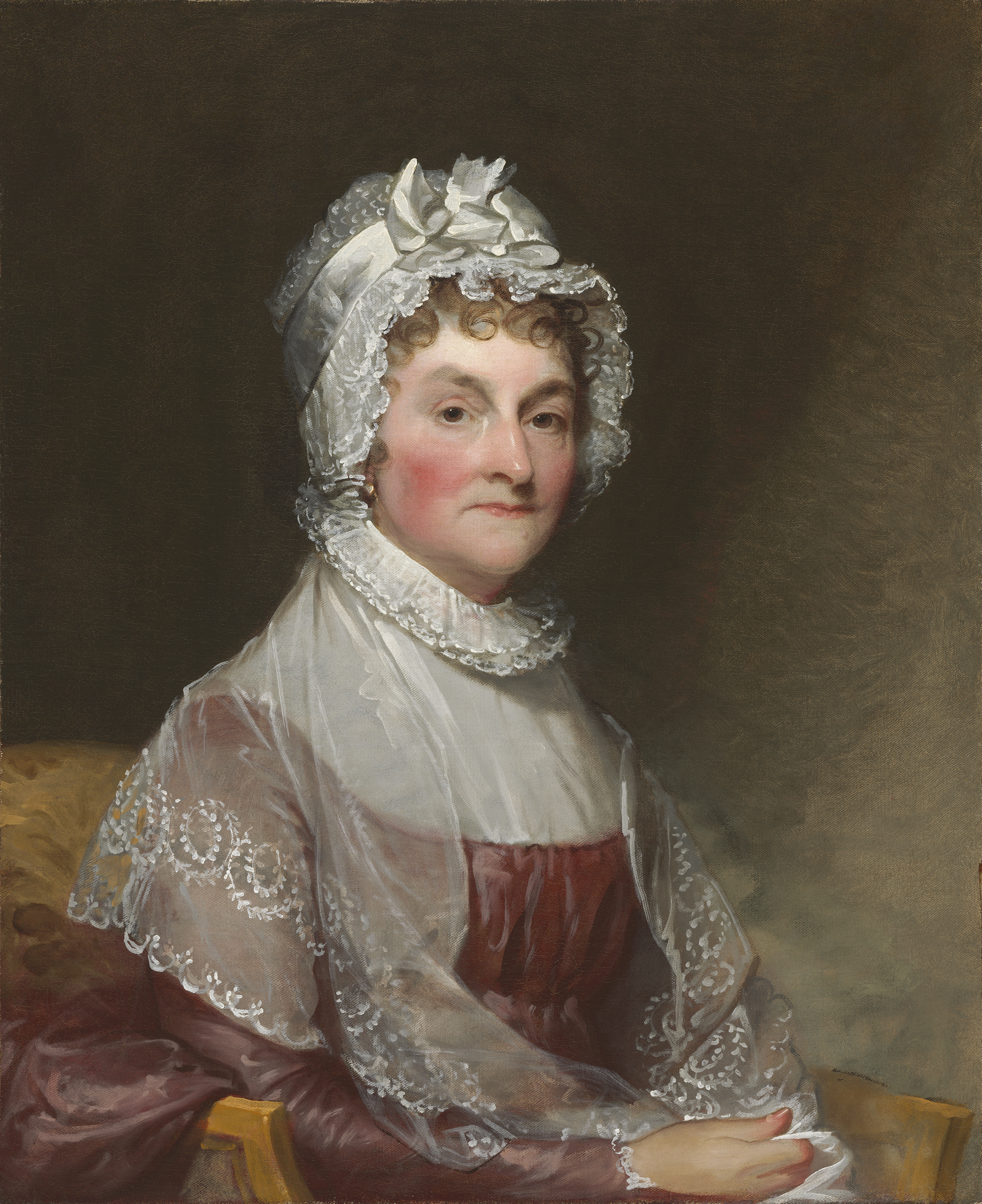
Portrait of Abigail Adams by Gilbert Stuart, c. 1810–1815

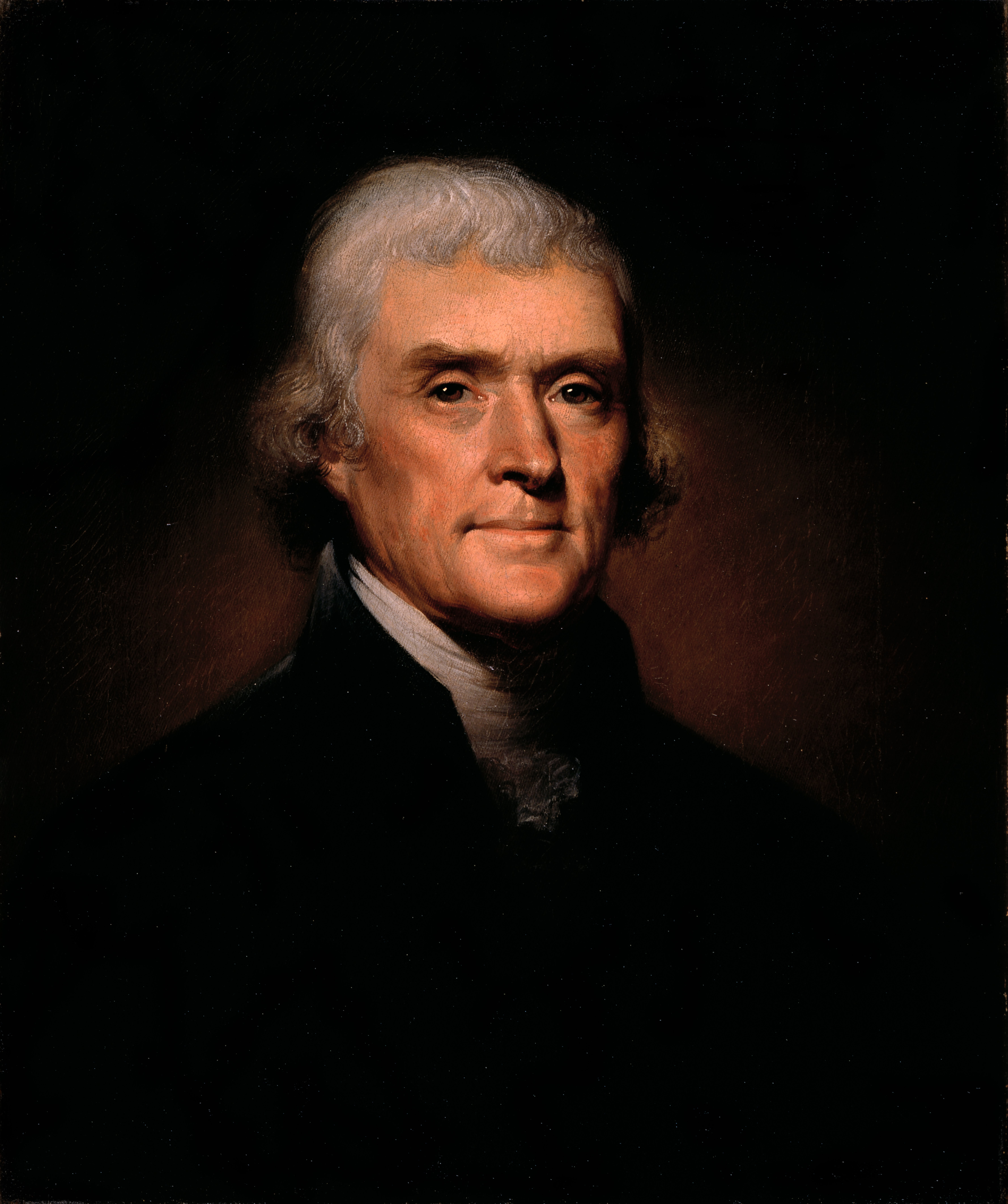
Portrait of Thomas Jefferson by Rembrandt Peale, 1800

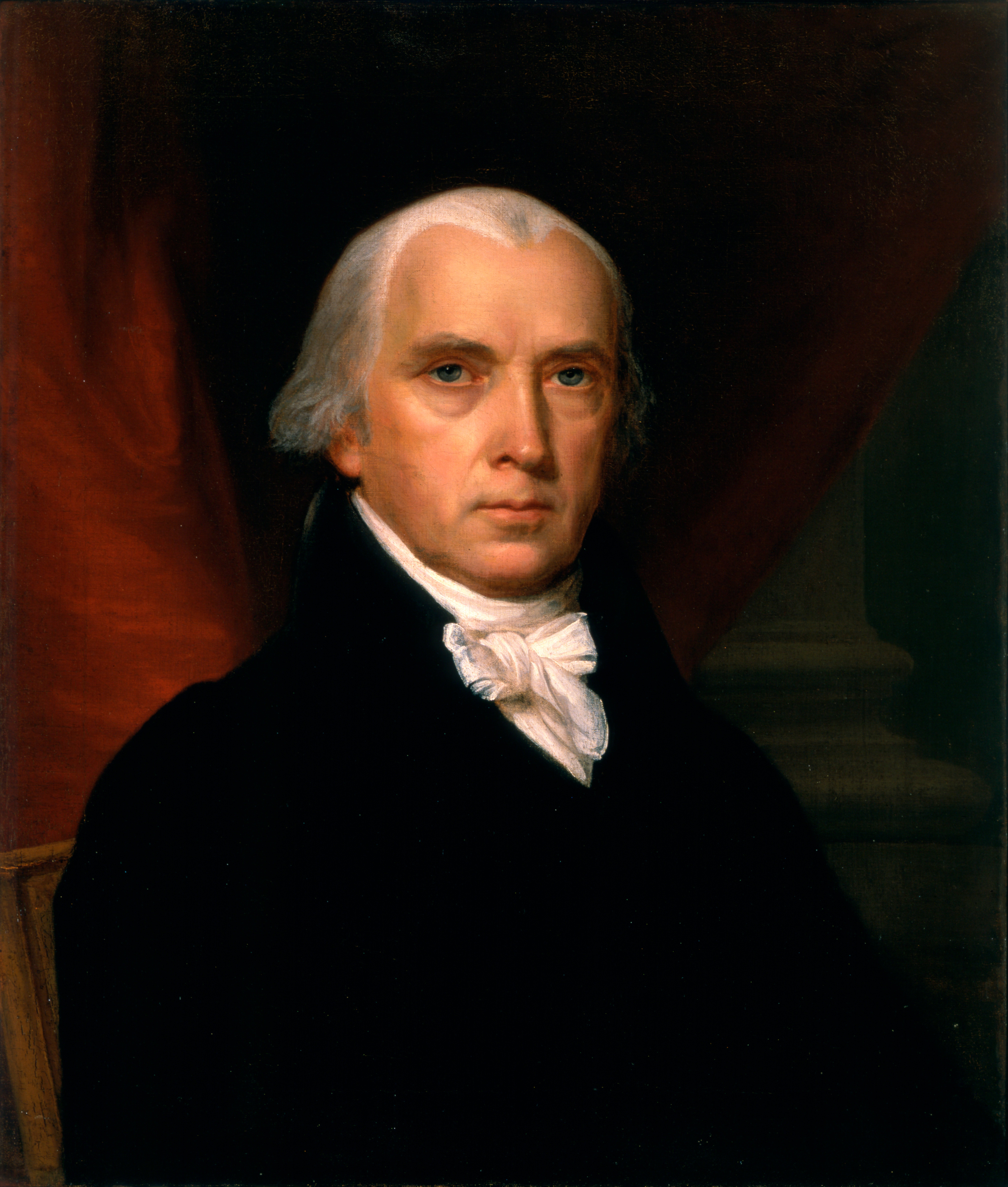
Portrait of James Madison by John Vanderlyn, 1816

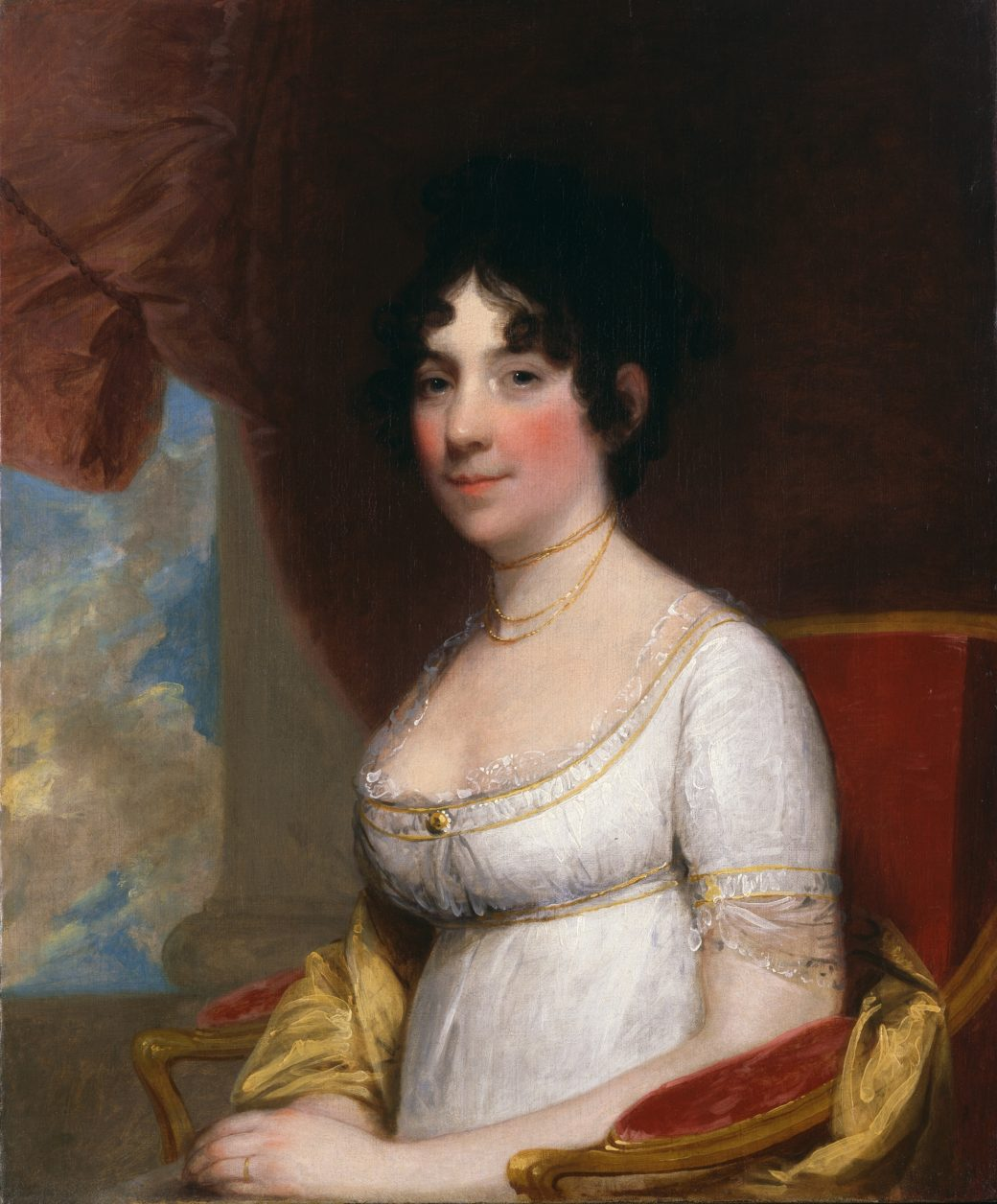
Portrait of Dolley Madison by Gilbert Stuart, 1804

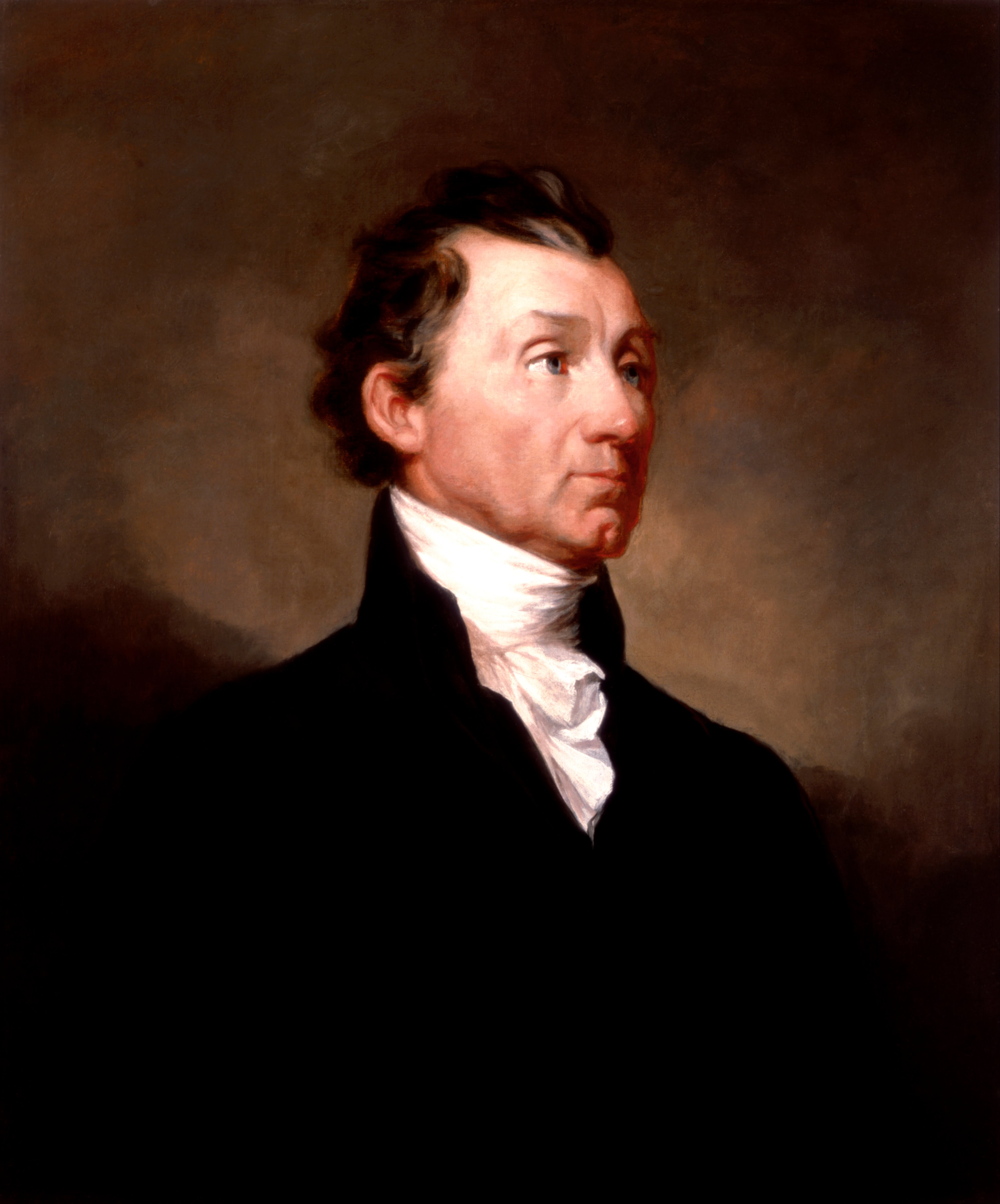
Portrait of James Monroe by Samuel F. B. Morse, 1819

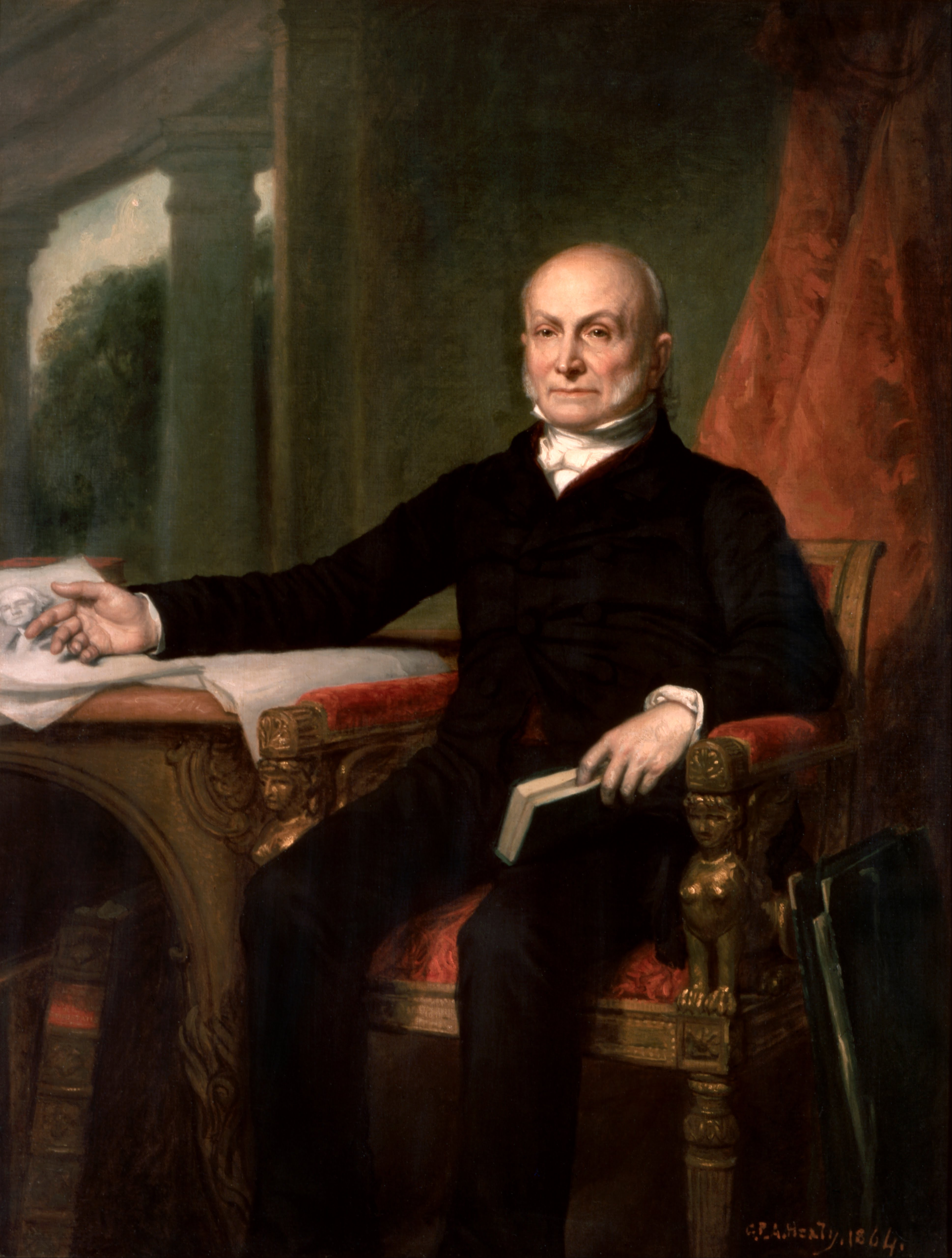
Portrait of John Quincy Adams by George Peter Alexander Healy, 1858

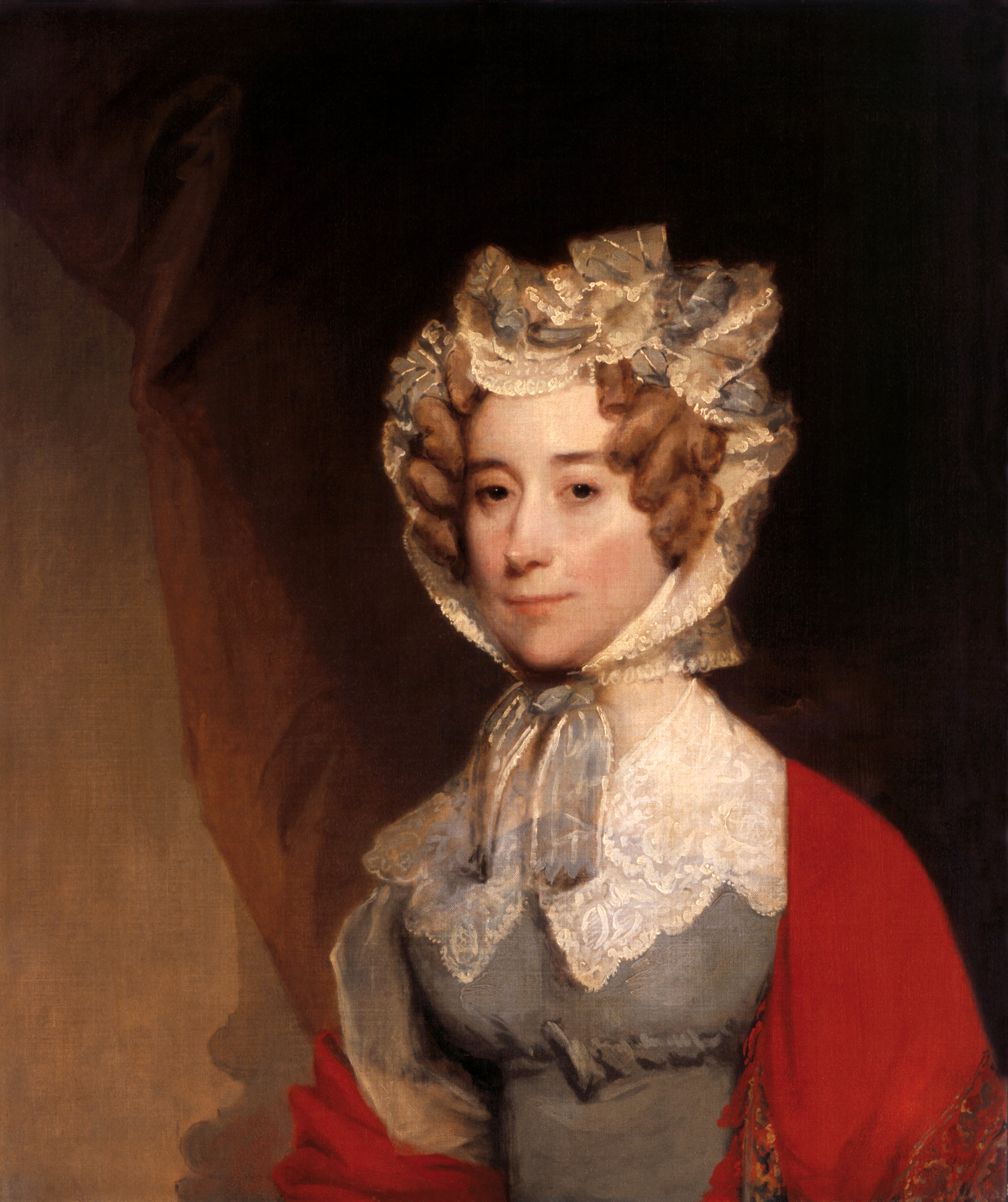
Portrait of Louisa Adams by Gilbert Stuart, c. 1821−1826

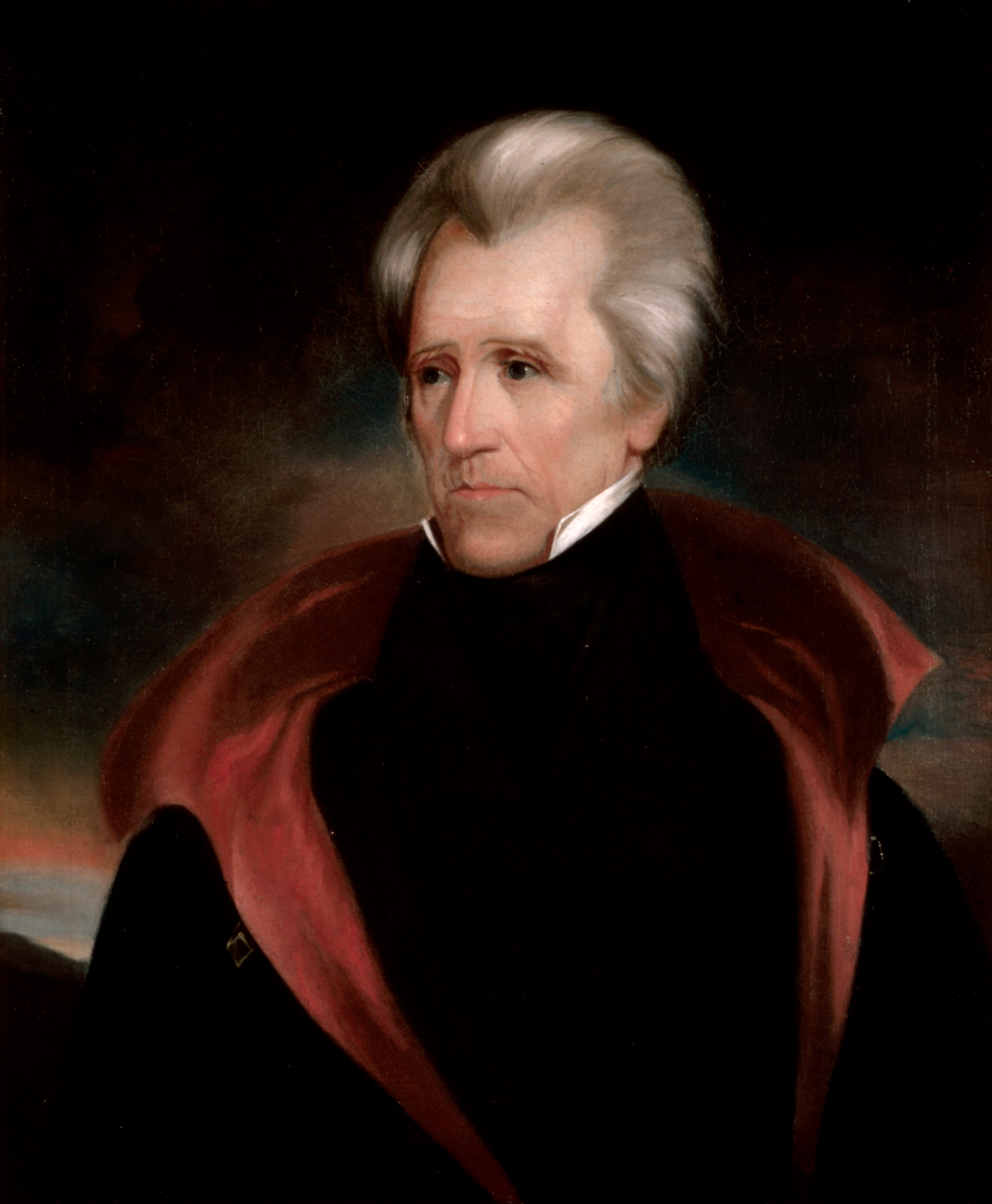
Portrait of Andrew Jackson by Ralph Eleaser Whiteside Earl, c. 1835

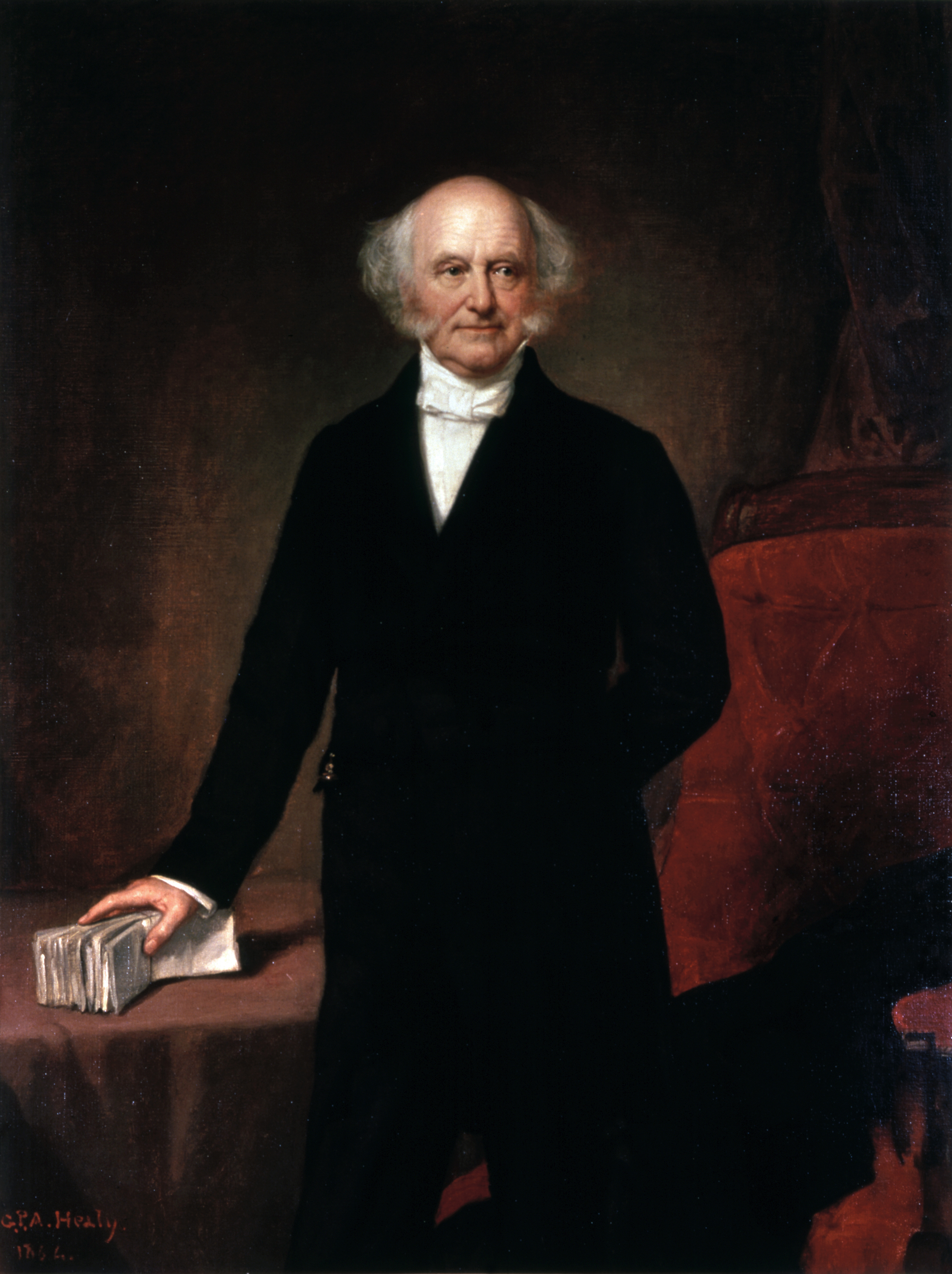
Portrait of Martin Van Buren by George Peter Alexander Healy, 1858

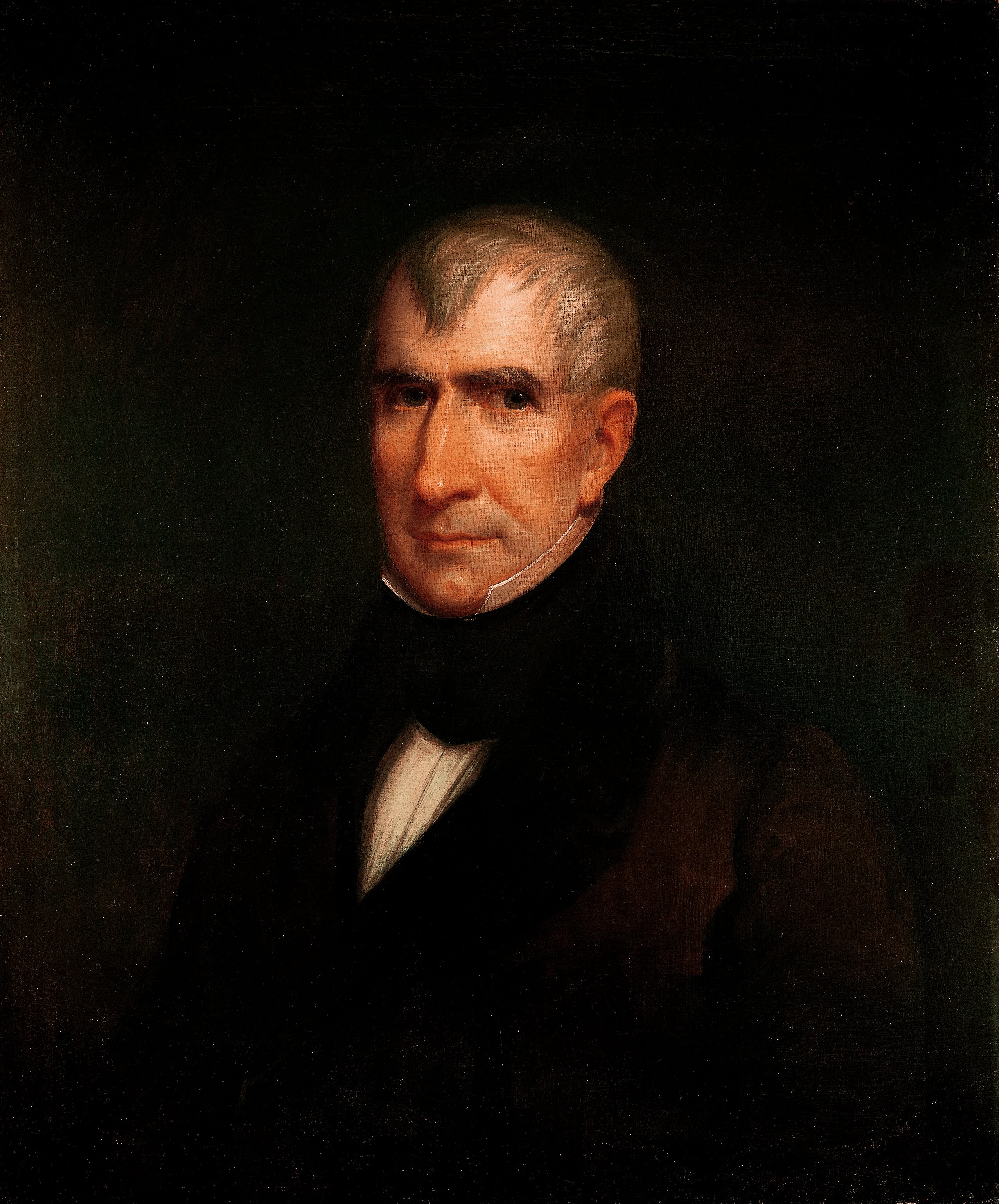
Portrait of William Henry Harrison by James Reid Lambdin, 1835

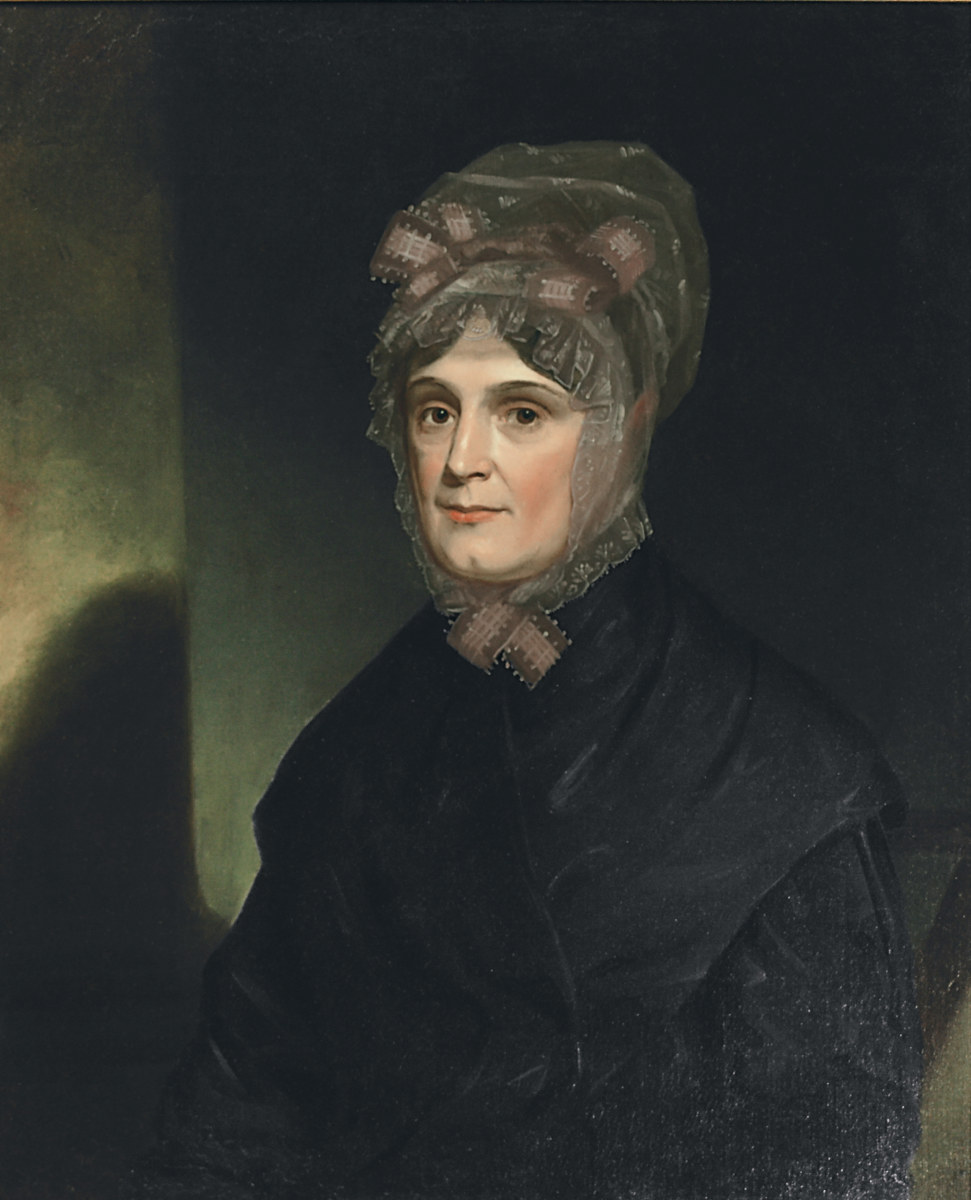
Portrait of Anna Harrison by Unknown, c. 1820

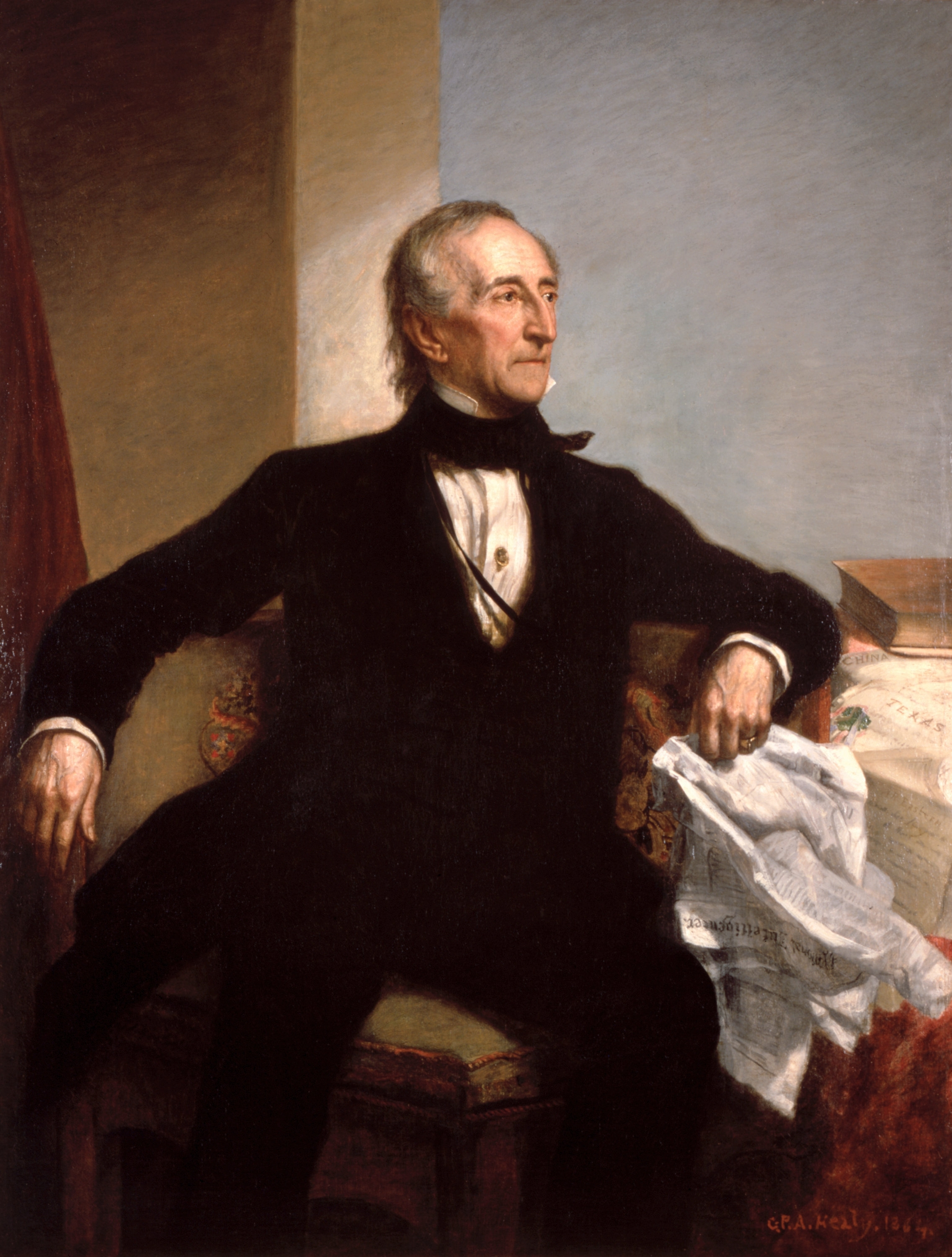
Portrait of John Tyler by George Peter Alexander Healy, 1864

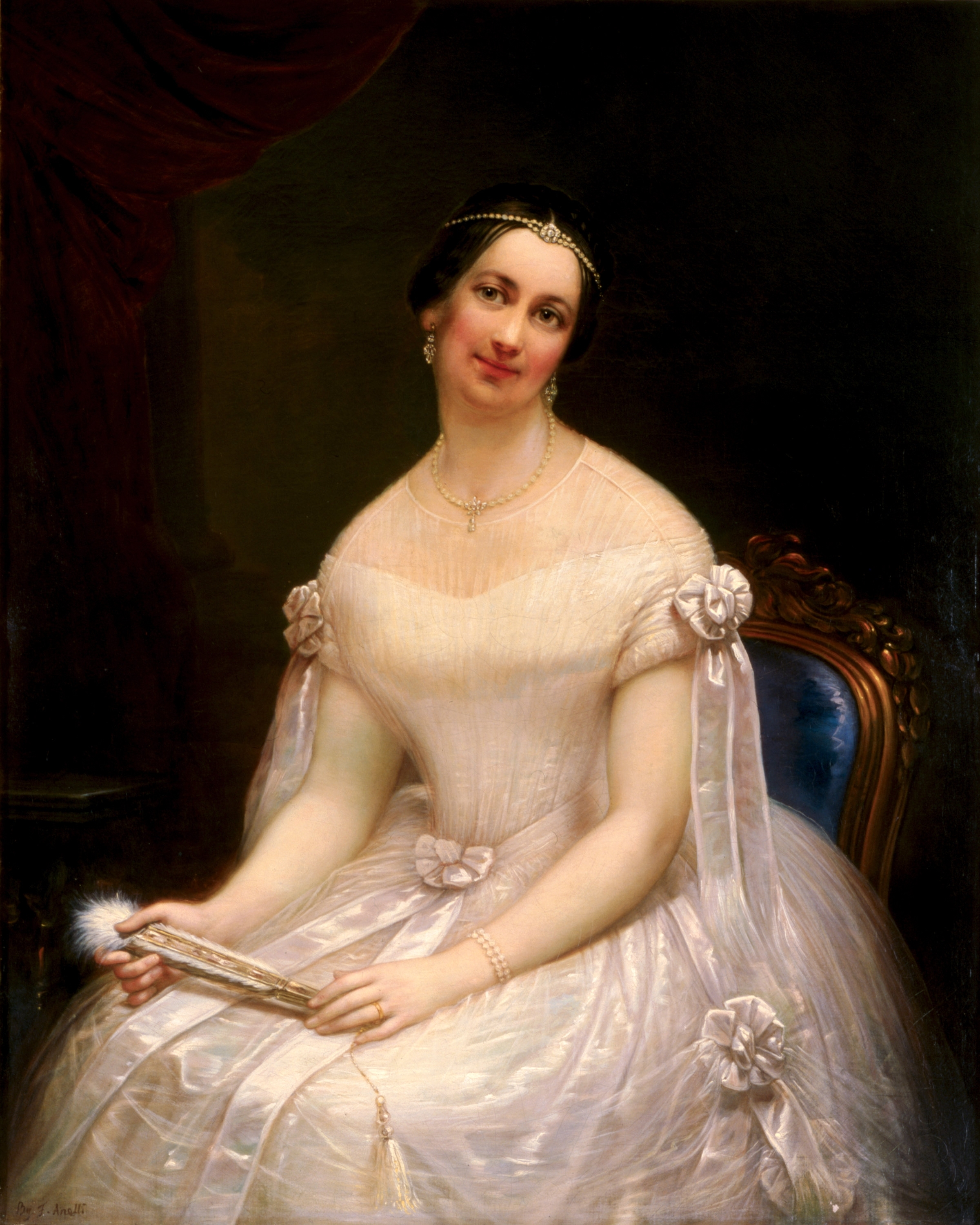
Portrait of Julia Tyler by Francesco Anelli, c. 1846−1848

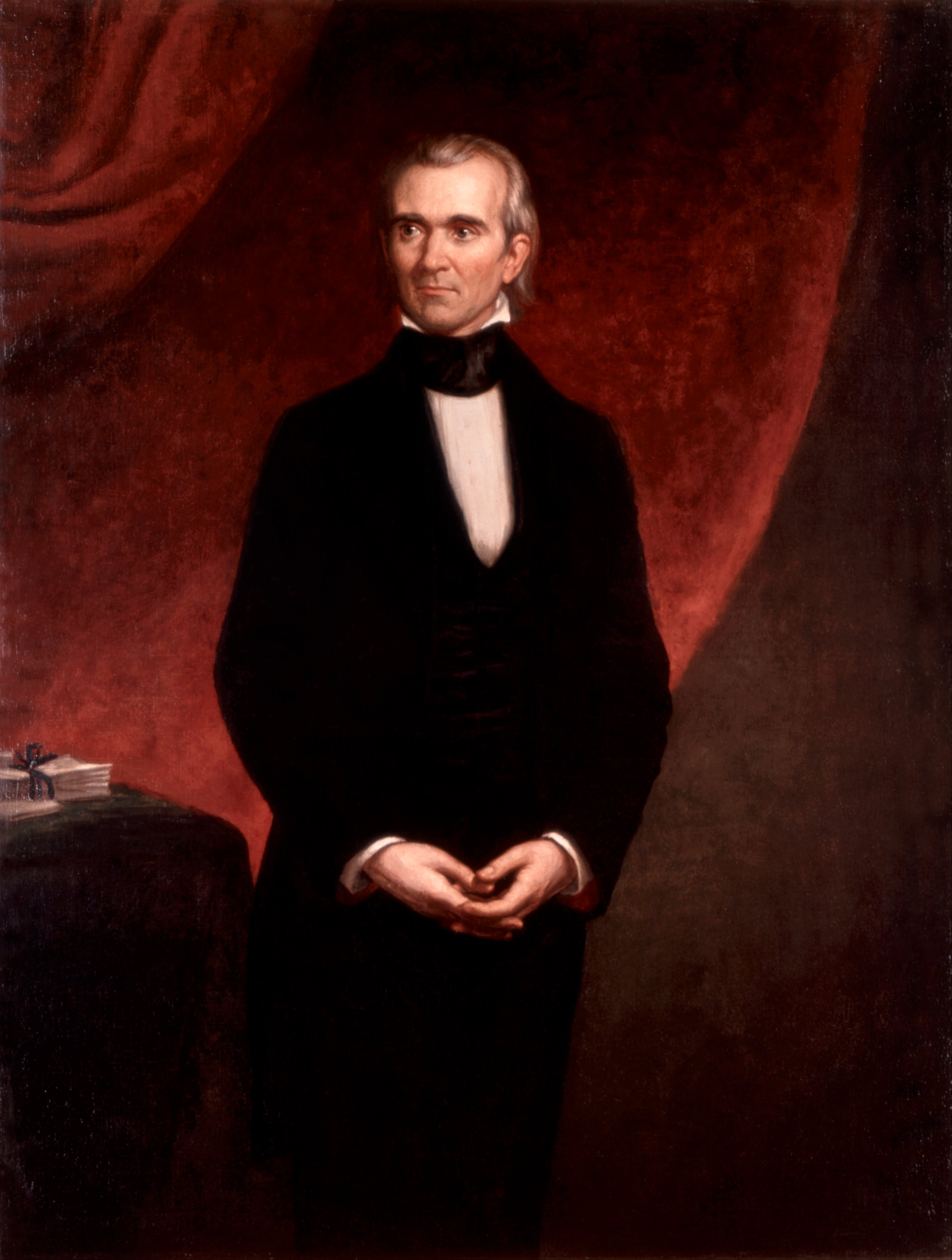
Portrait of James Knox Polk by George Peter Alexander Healy, 1858

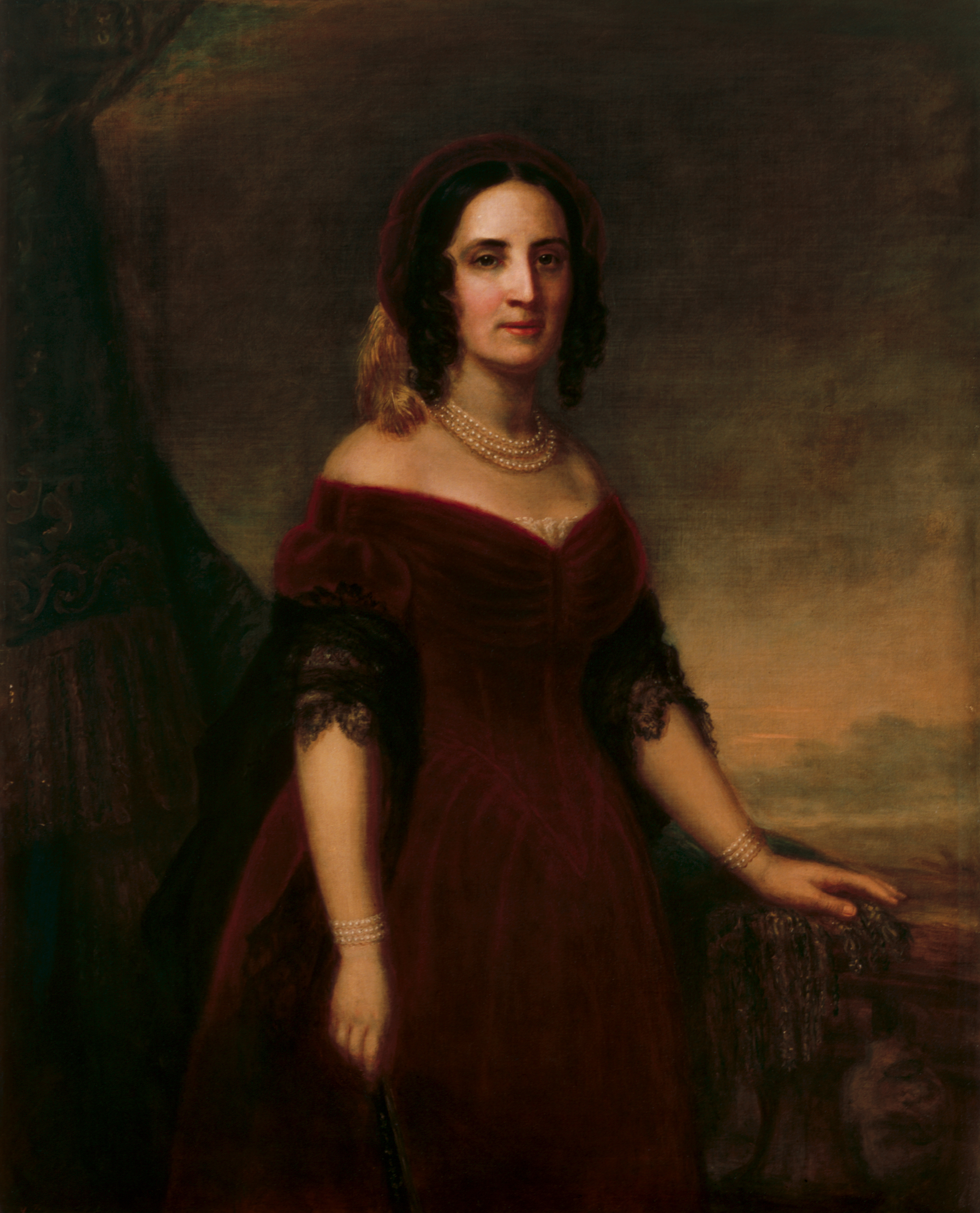
Portrait of Sarah Polk by George Dury, 1883

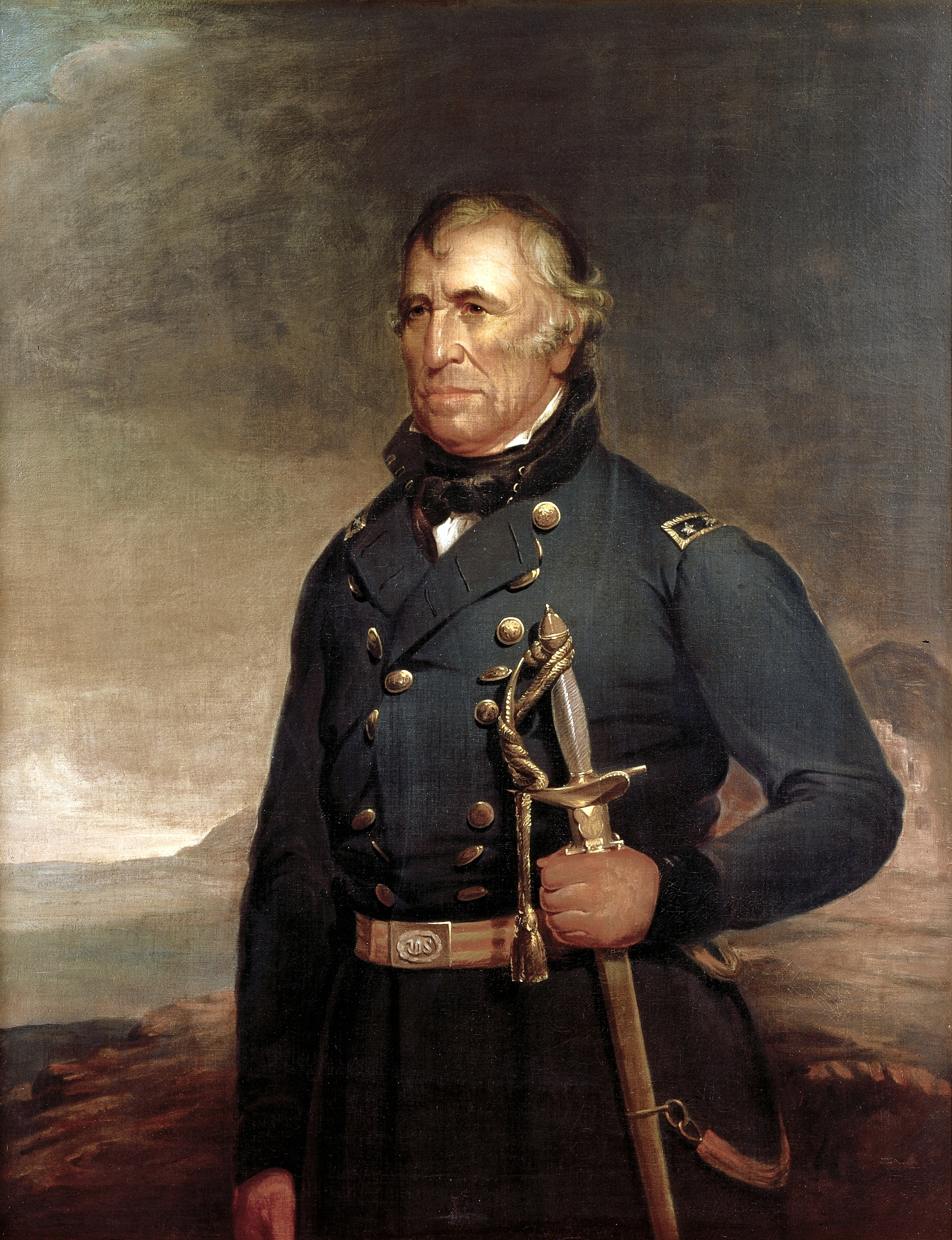
Portrait of Zachary Taylor by Joseph H. Bush, 1848

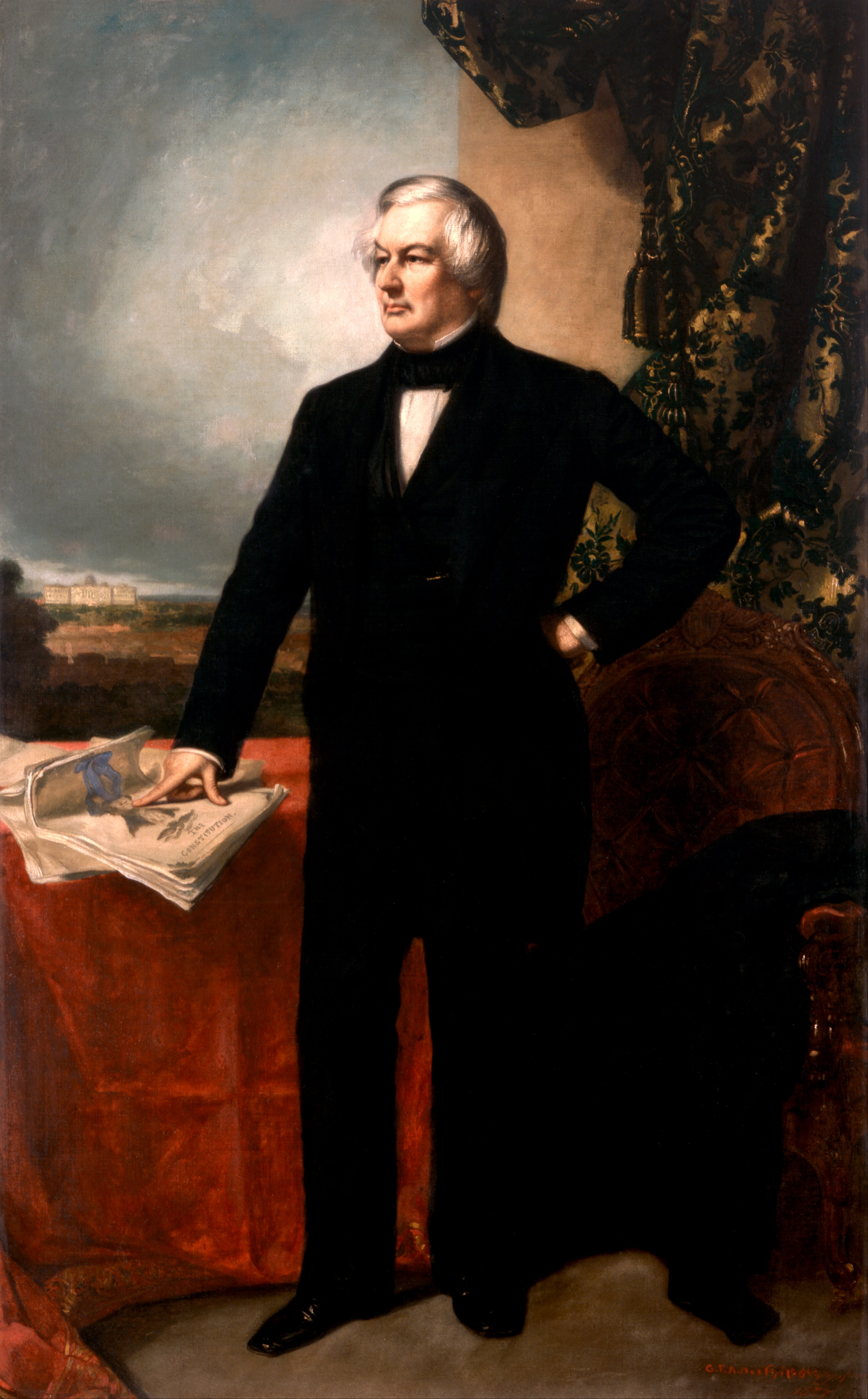
Portrait of Millard Fillmore by George Peter Alexander Healy, 1857

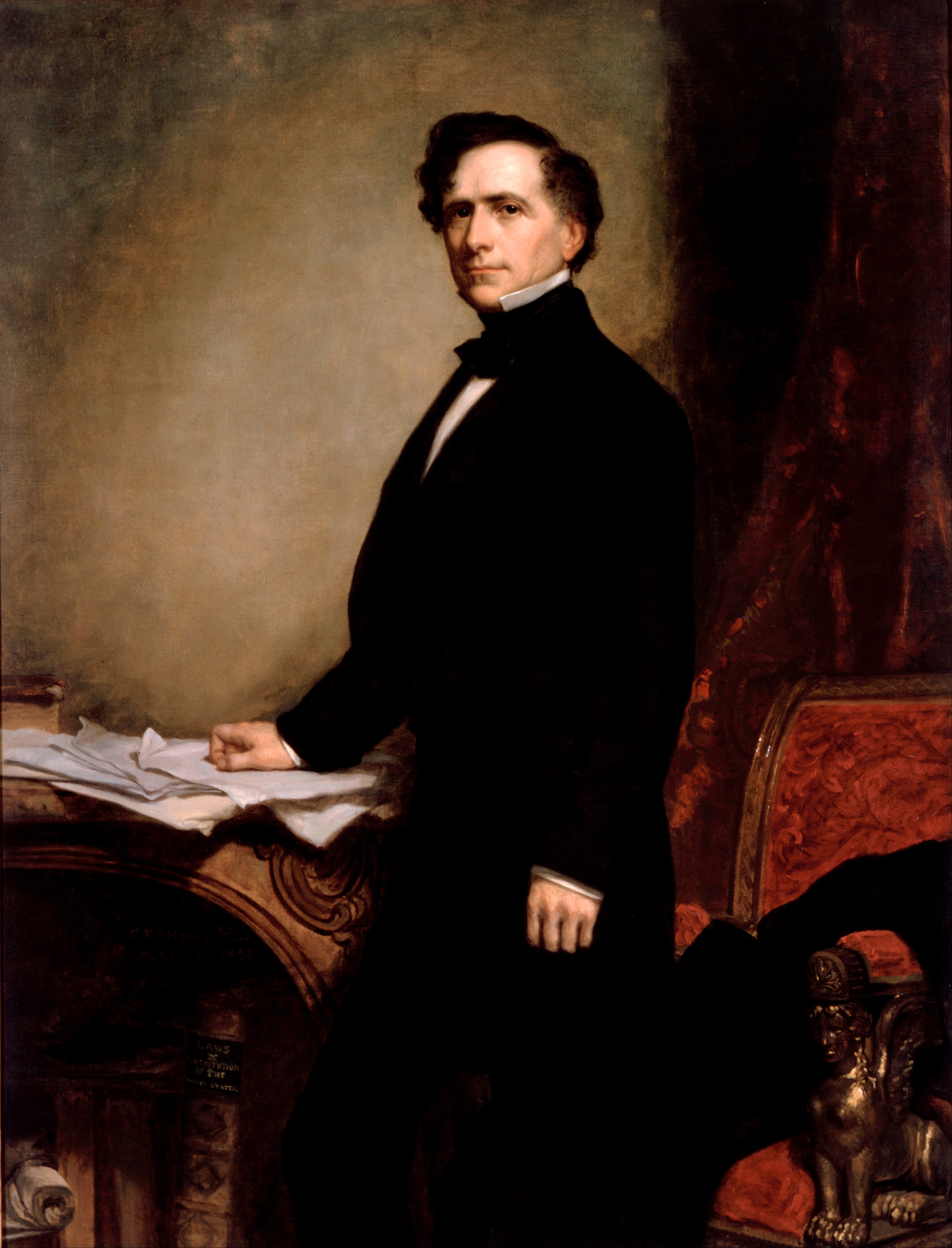
Portrait of Franklin Pierce by George Peter Alexander Healy, 1858

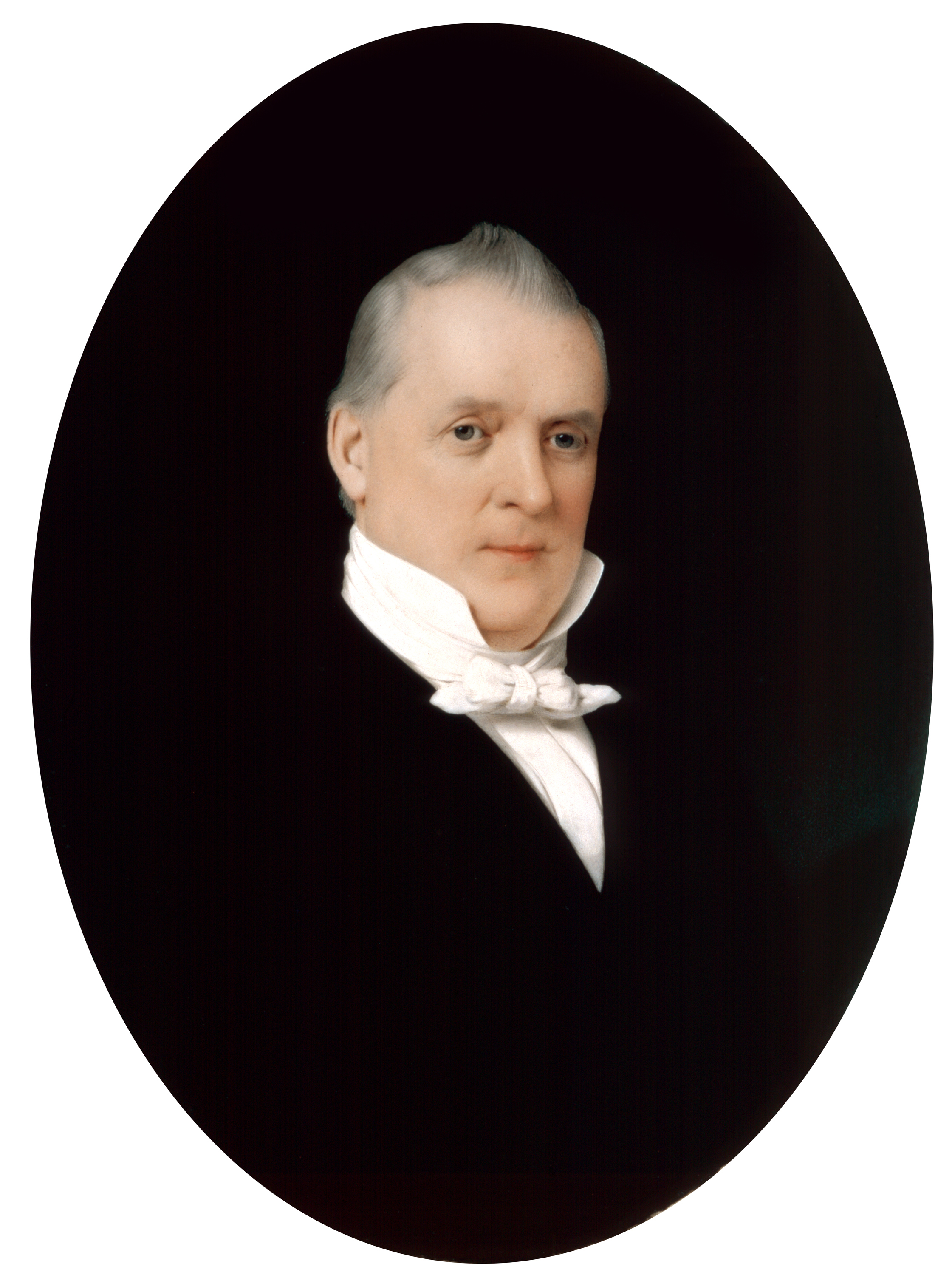
Portrait of James Buchanan by John Henry Brown, 1851

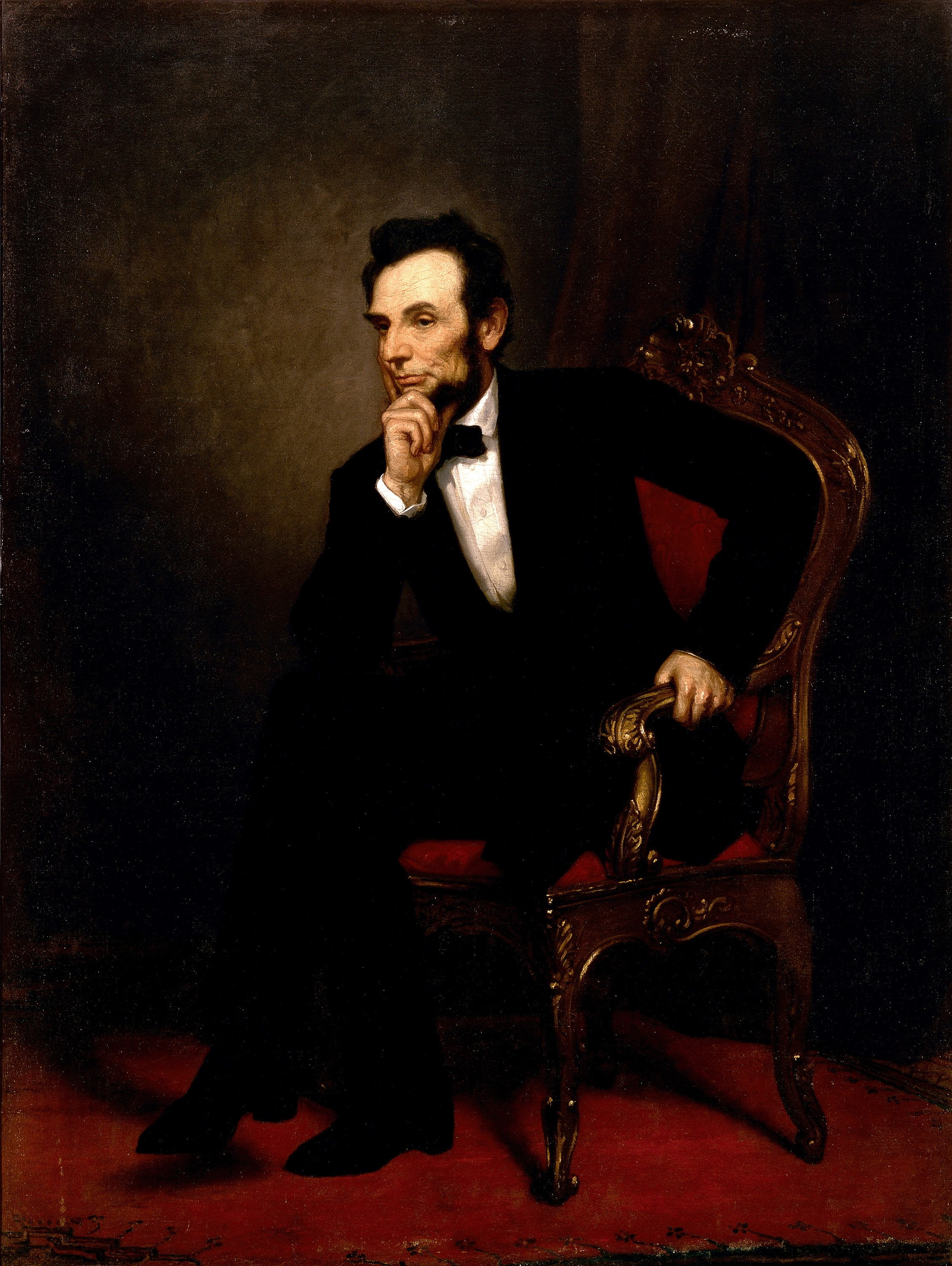
Portrait of Abraham Lincoln by George Peter Alexander Healy, 1869

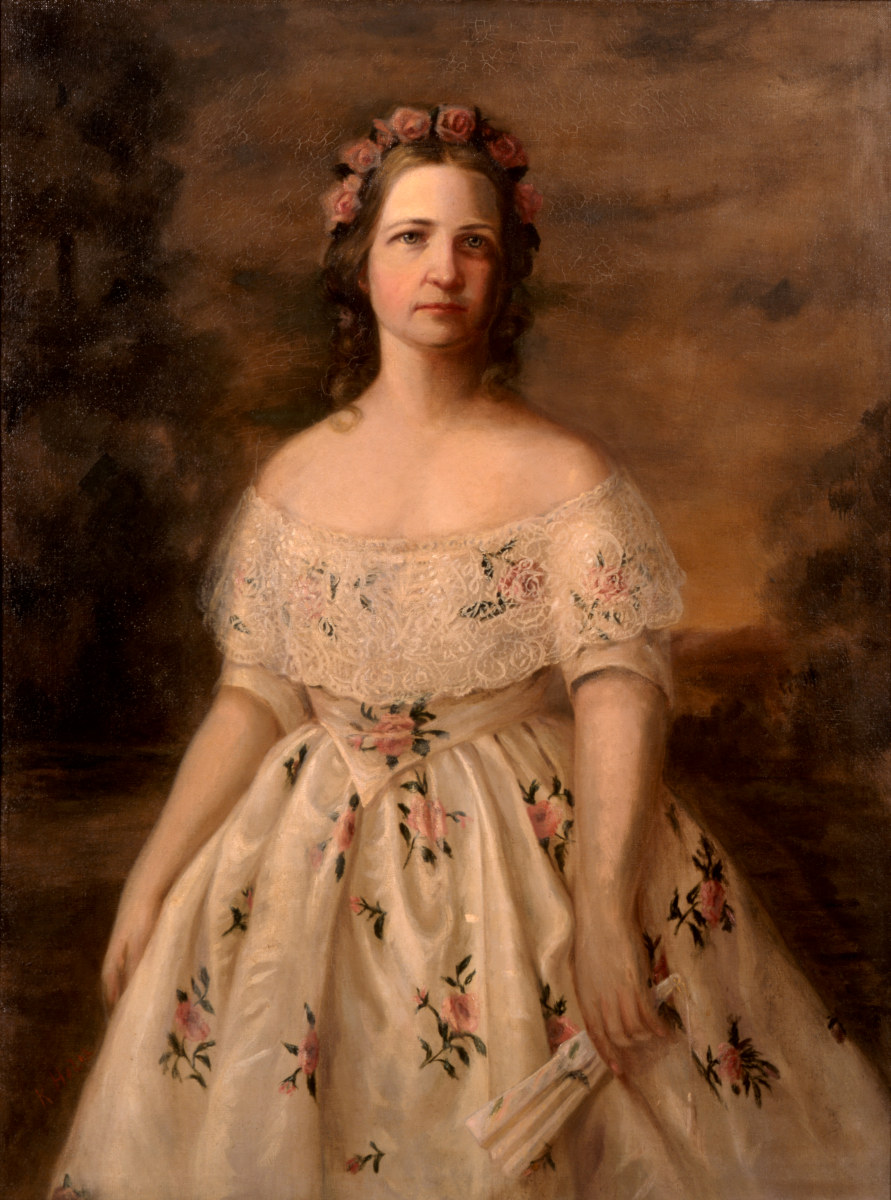
Portrait of Mary Todd Lincoln by Katherine Helm, 1925

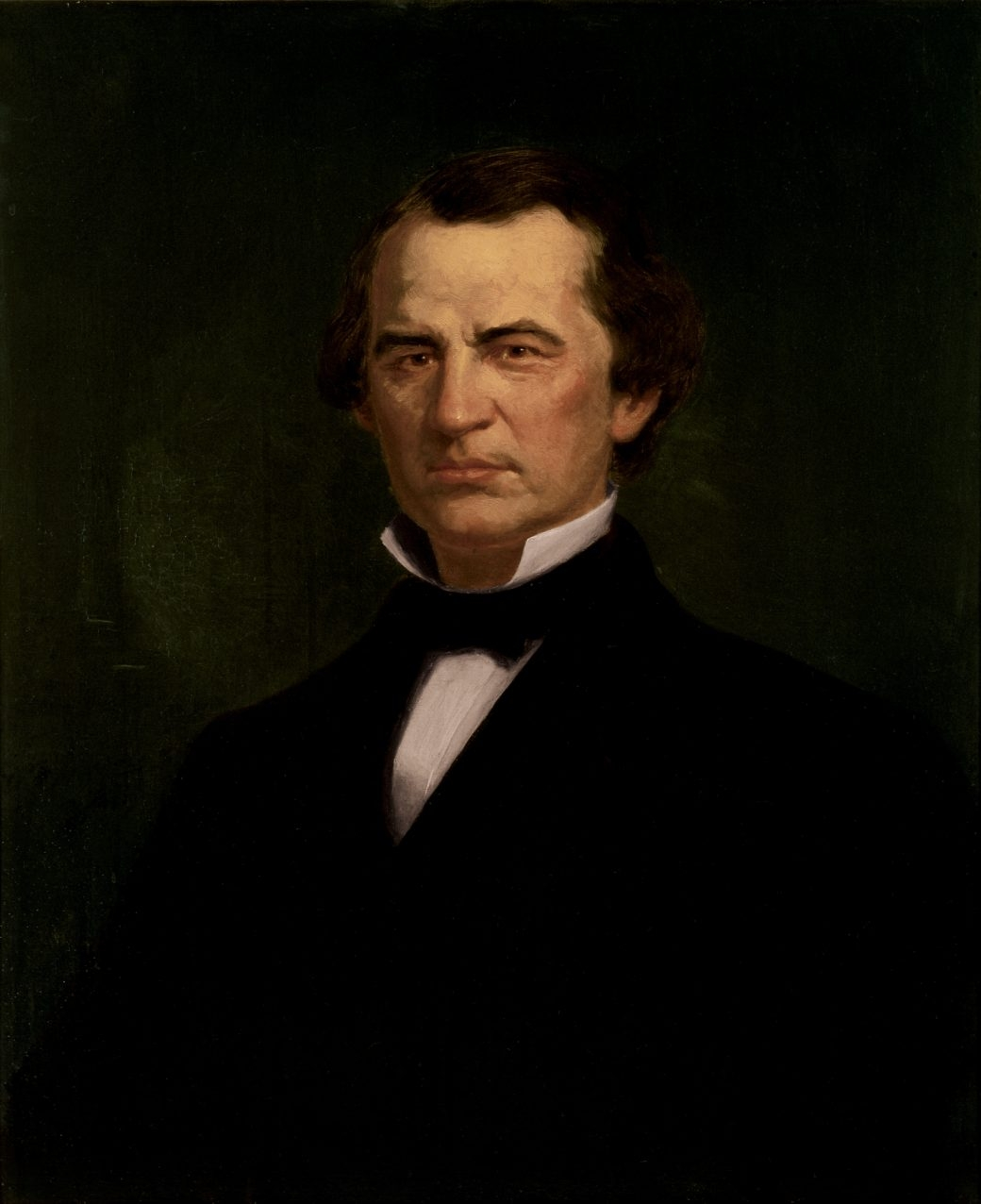
Portrait of Andrew Johnson by Eliphalet Frazer Andrews, 1880

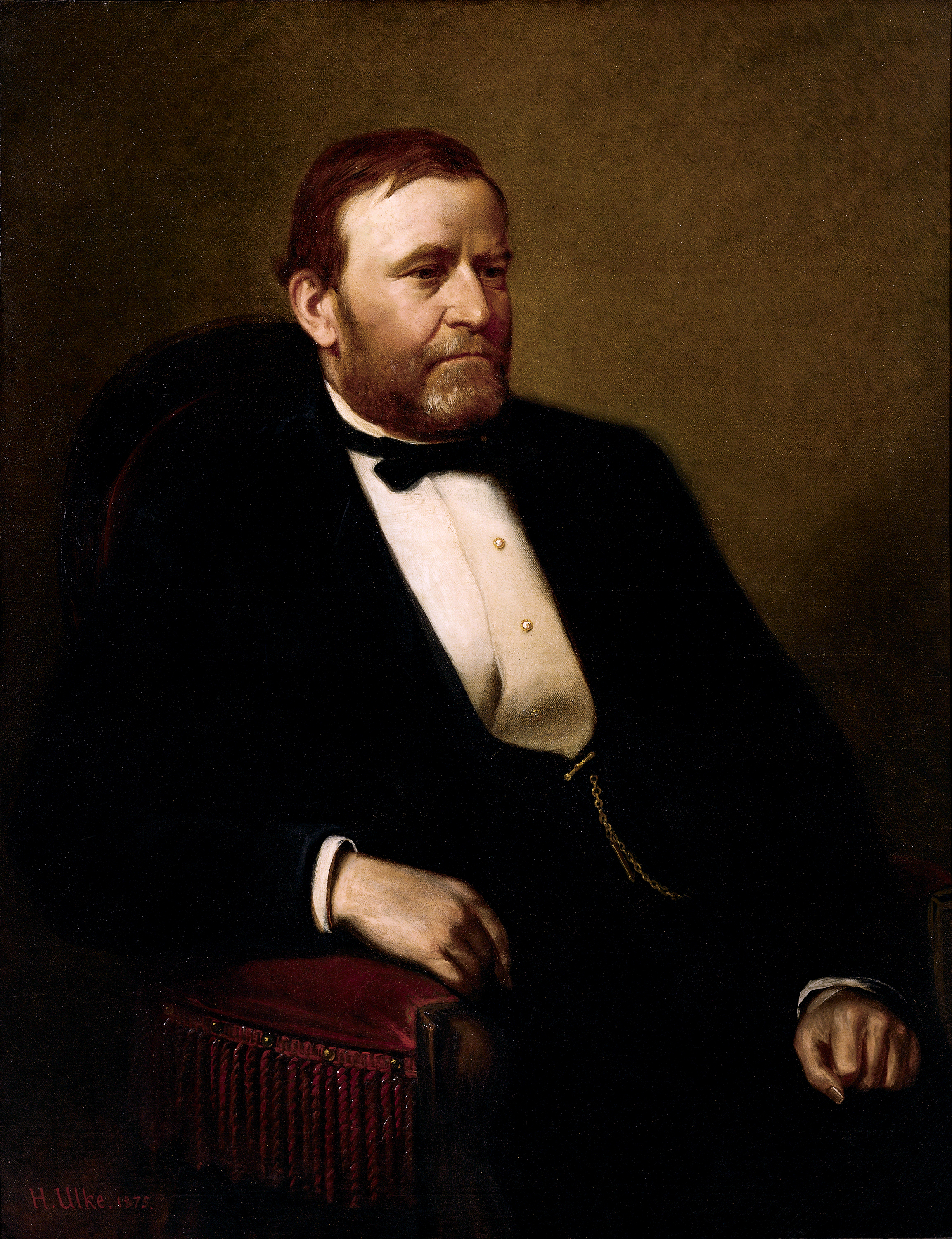
Portrait of Ulysses S. Grant by Henry Ulke, 1875

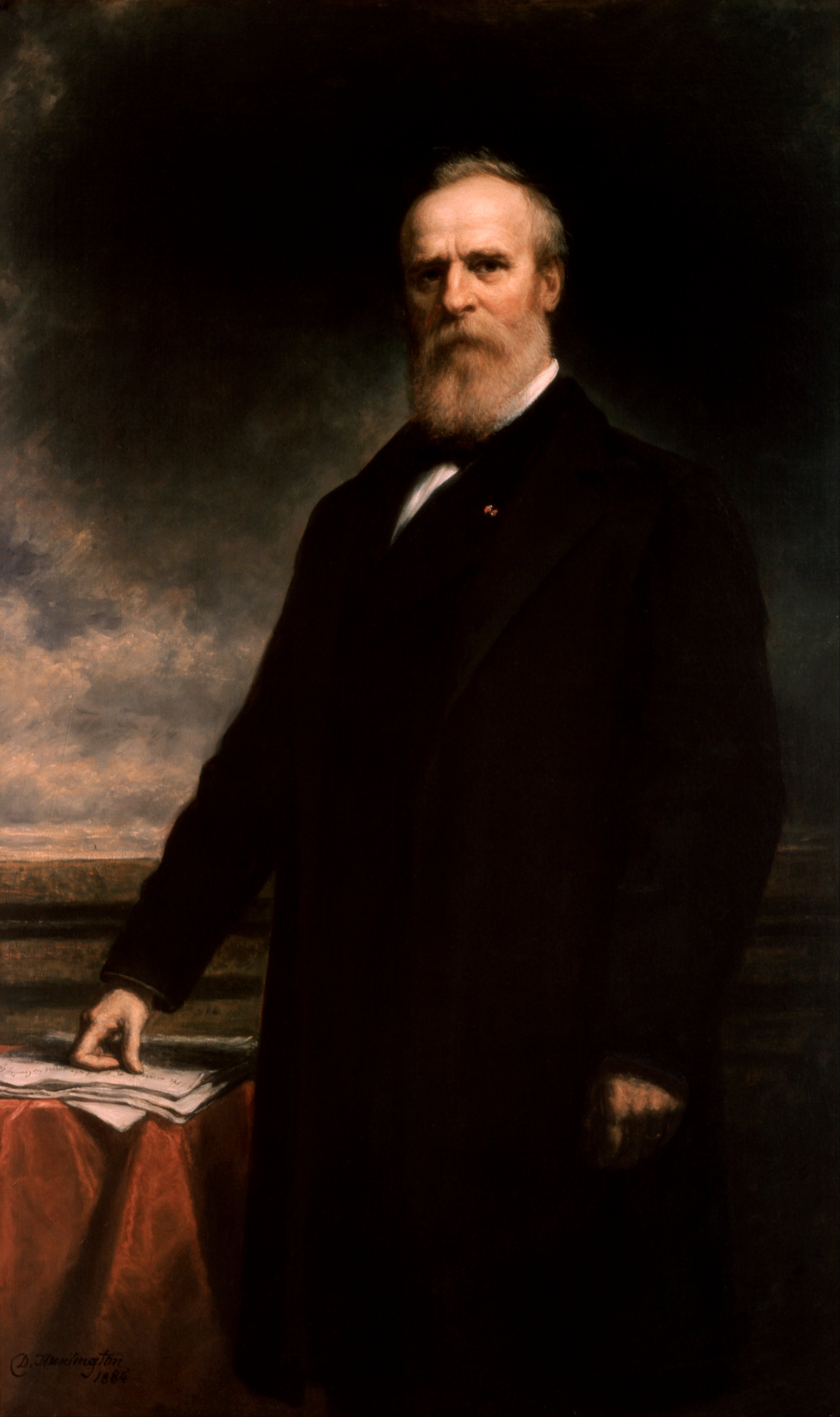
Portrait of Rutherford B. Hayes by Daniel Huntington, 1884

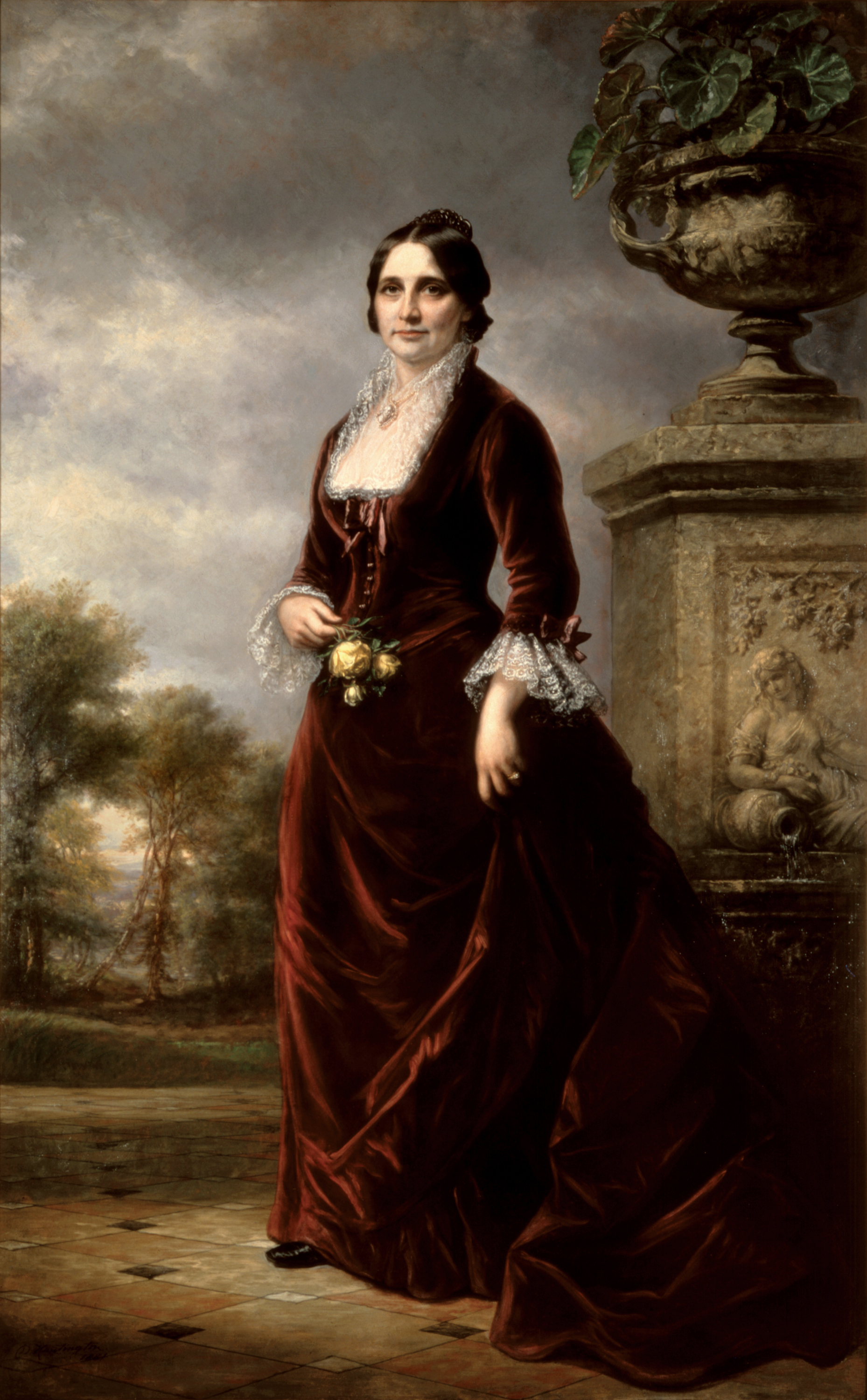
Portrait of Lucy Webb Hayes by Daniel Huntington, 1881

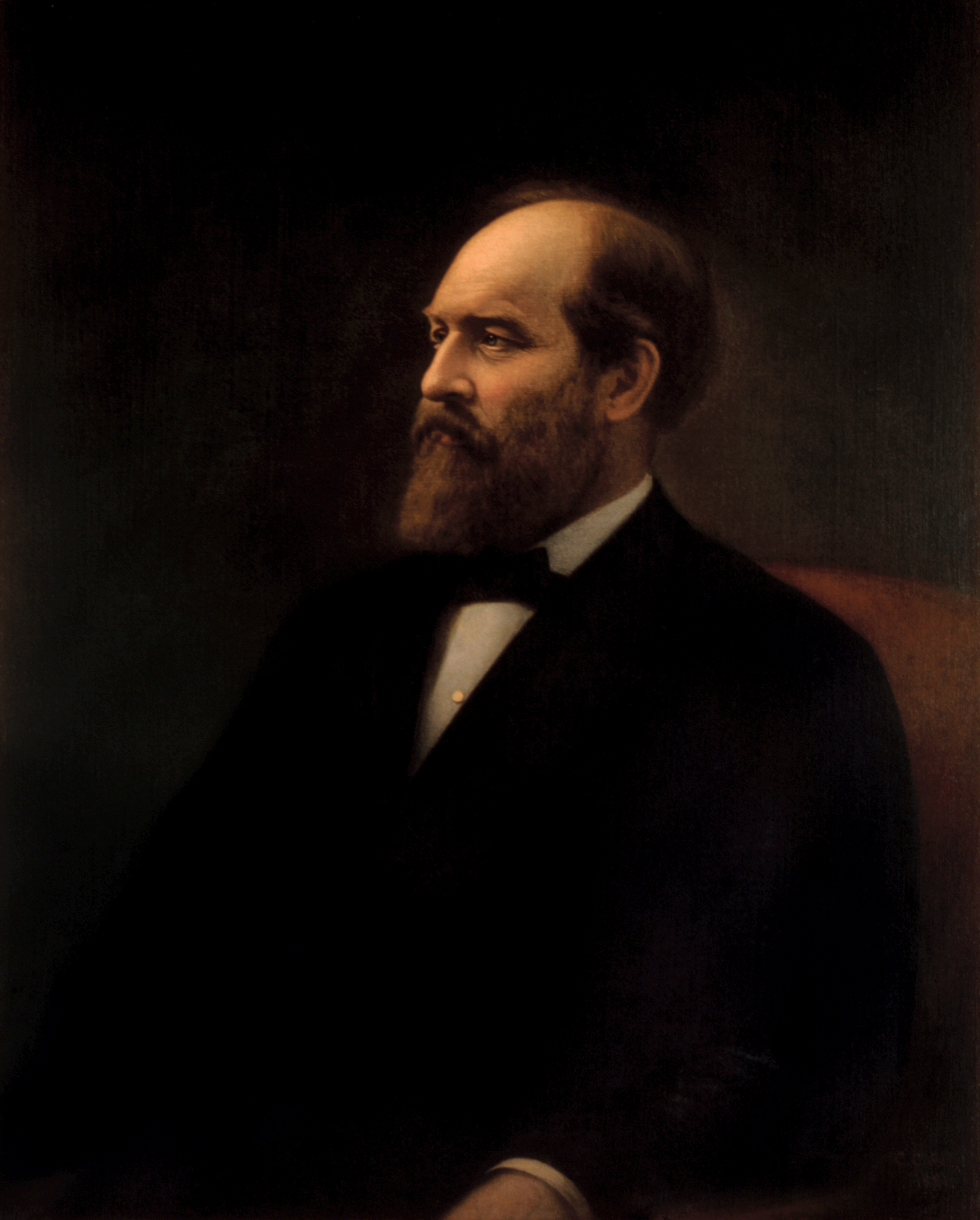
Portrait of James A. Garfield by Calvin Curtis, 1881

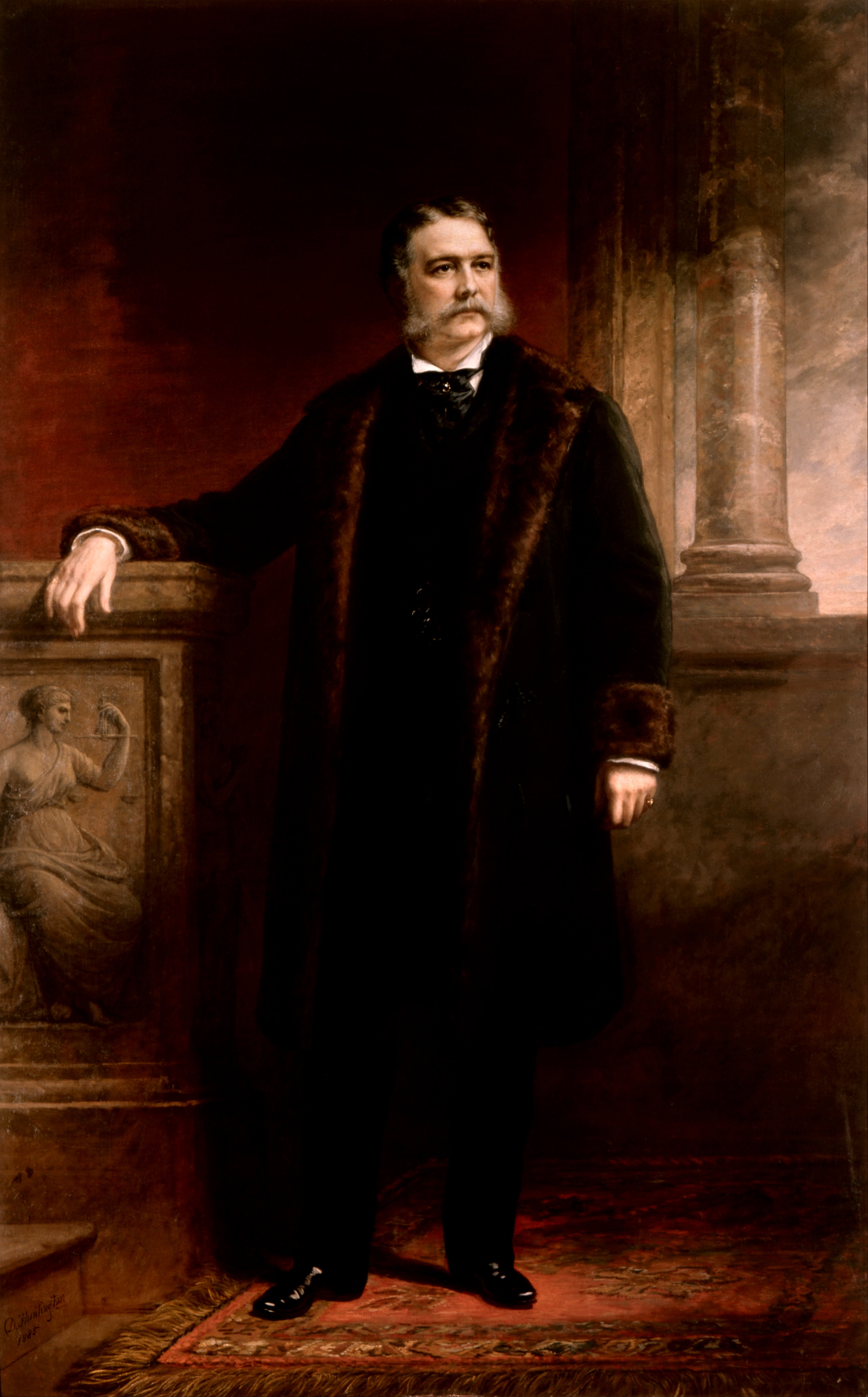
Portrait of Chester A. Arthur by Daniel Huntington, 1885

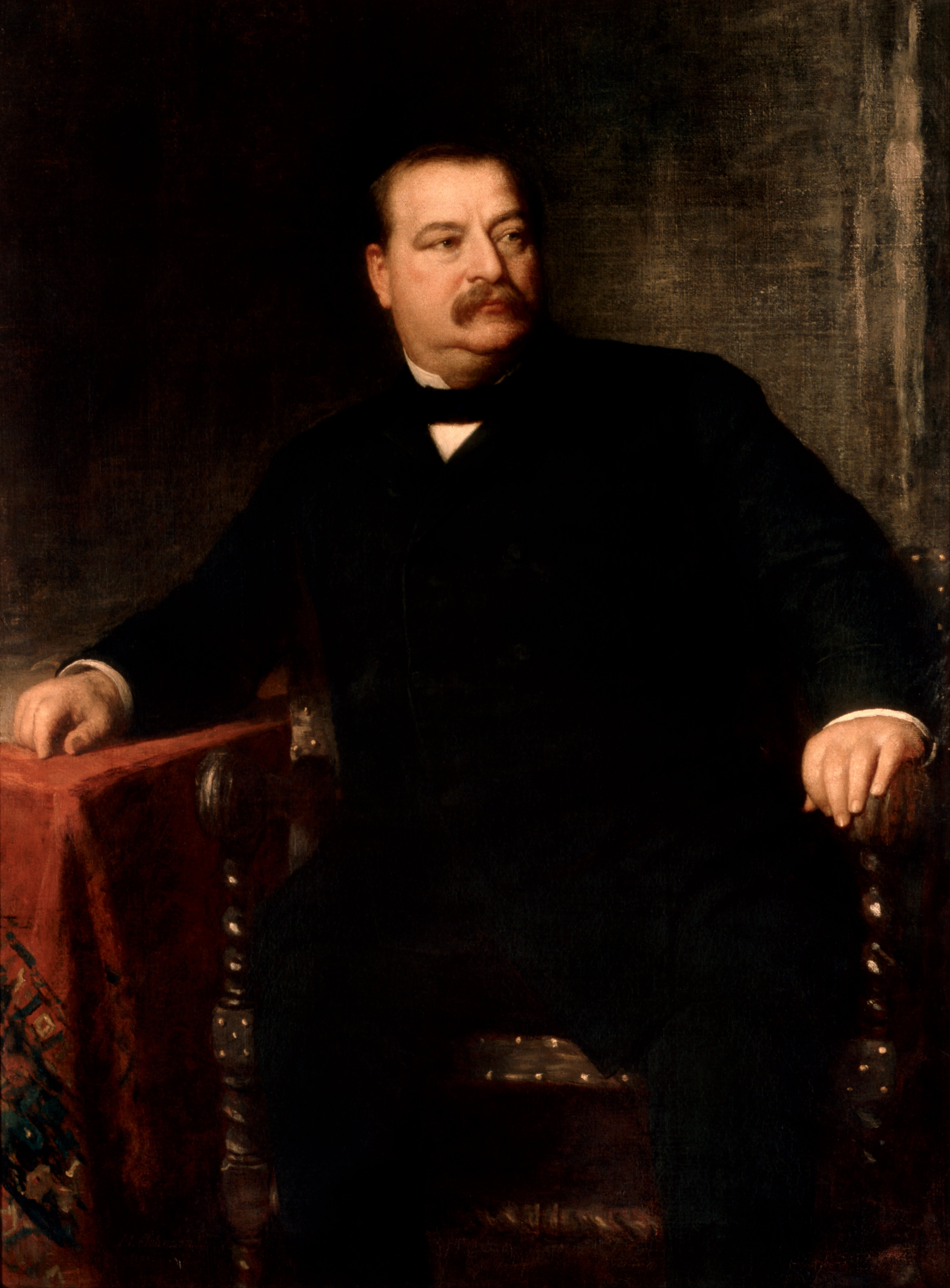
Portrait of Grover Cleveland by Jonathan Eastman Johnson, 1891

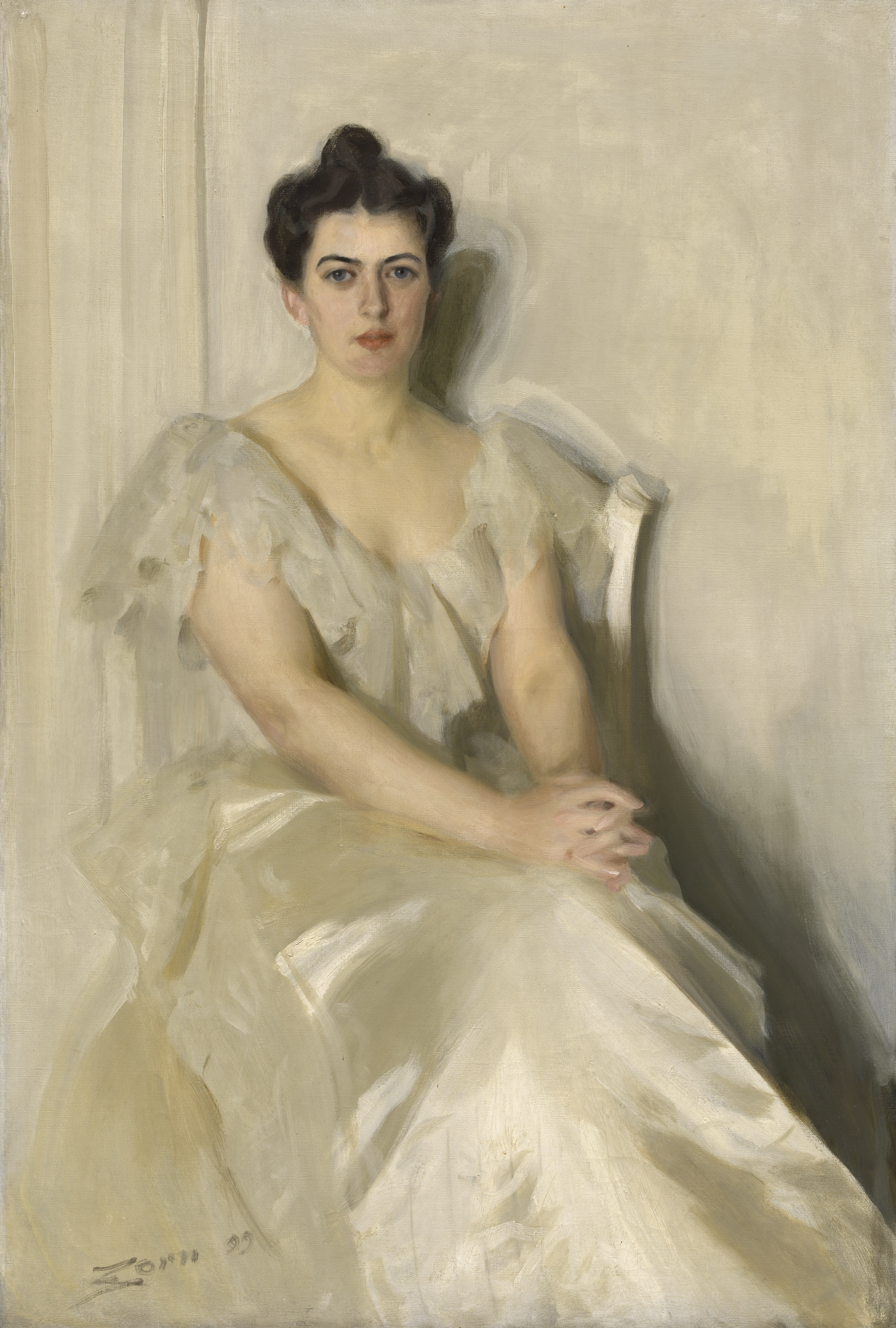
Portrait of Frances Folsom Cleveland by Anders Zorn, 1899

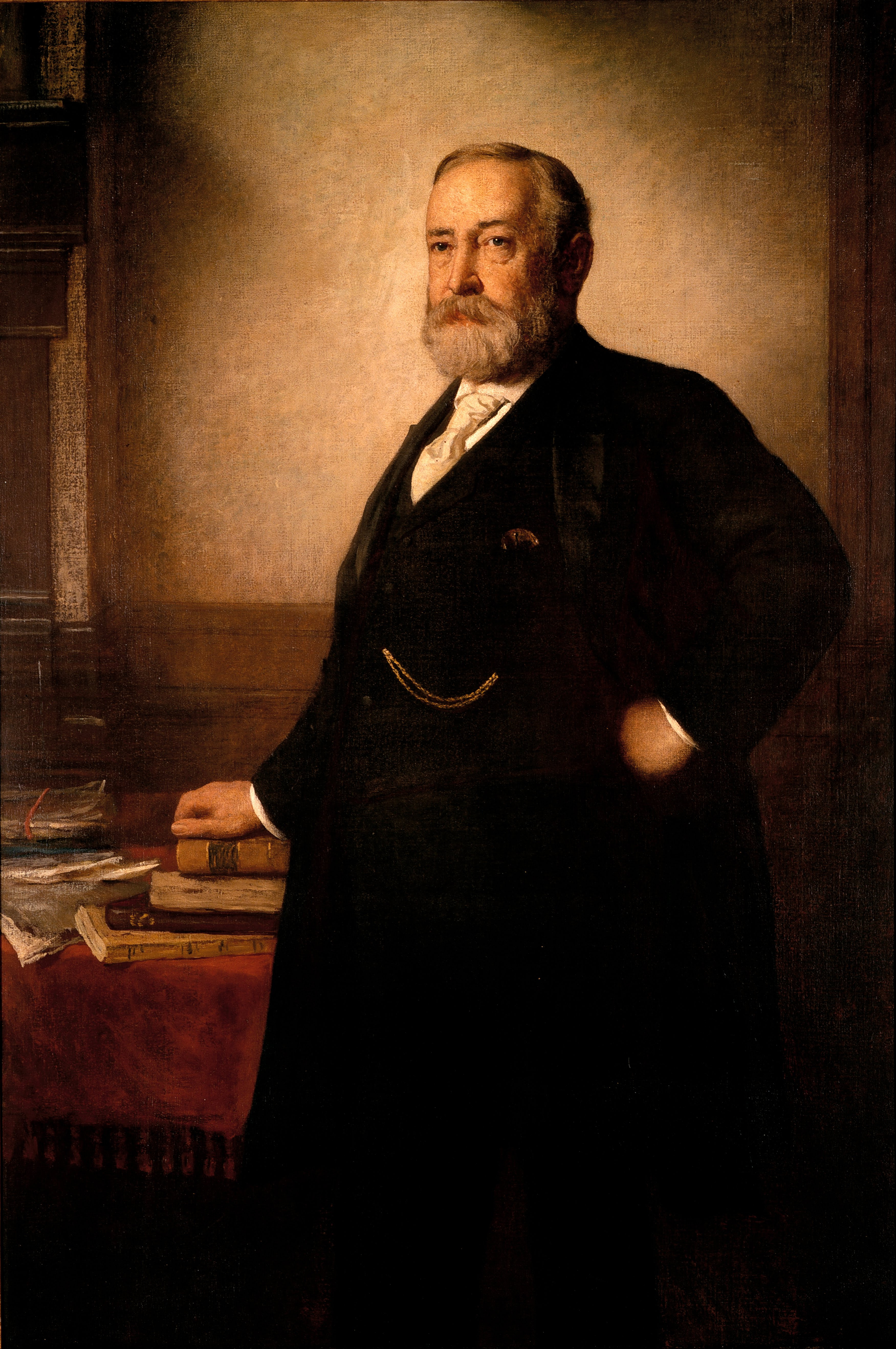
Portrait of Benjamin Harrison by Jonathan Eastman Johnson, 1895

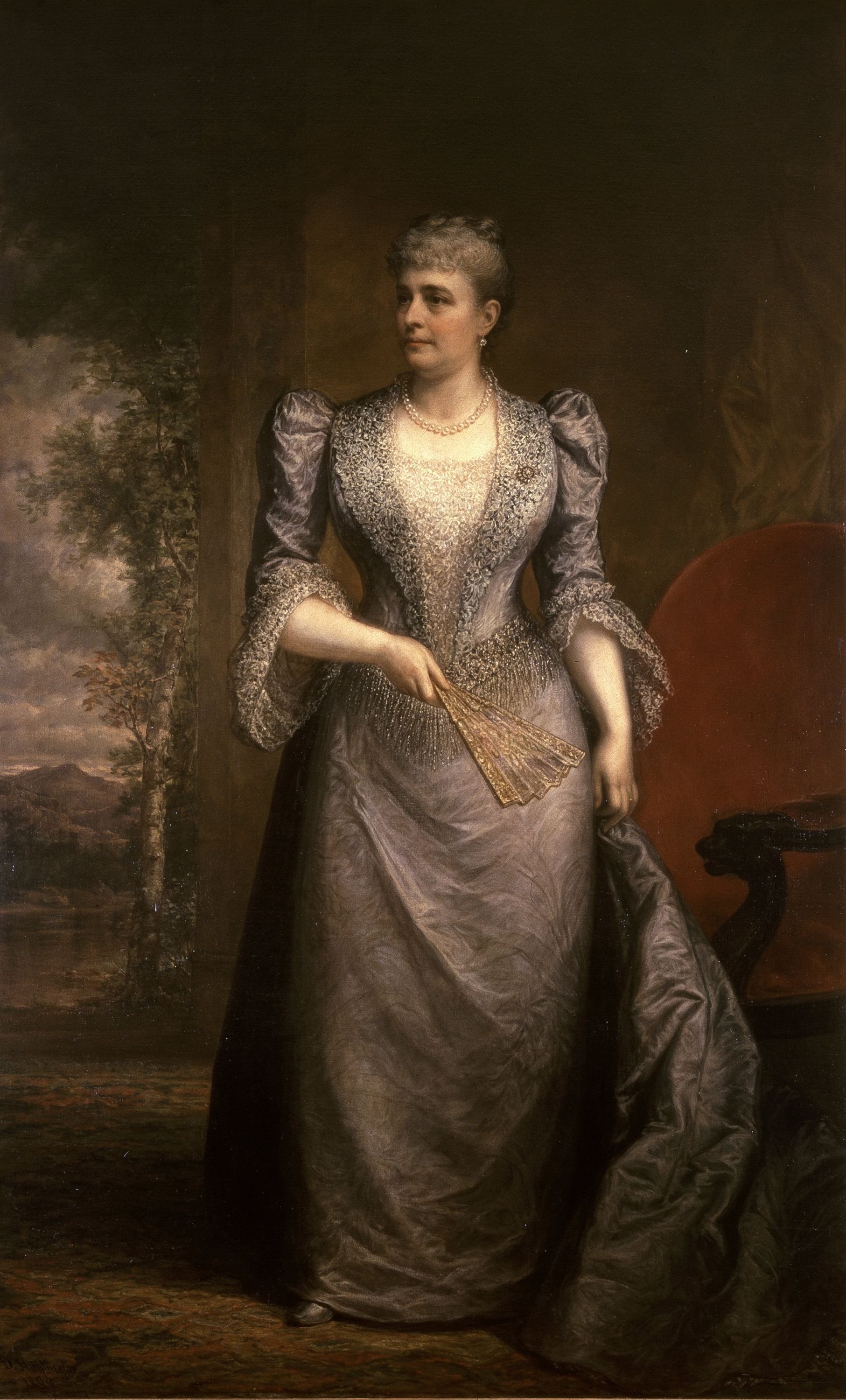
Portrait of Caroline Harrison by Daniel Huntington, 1894

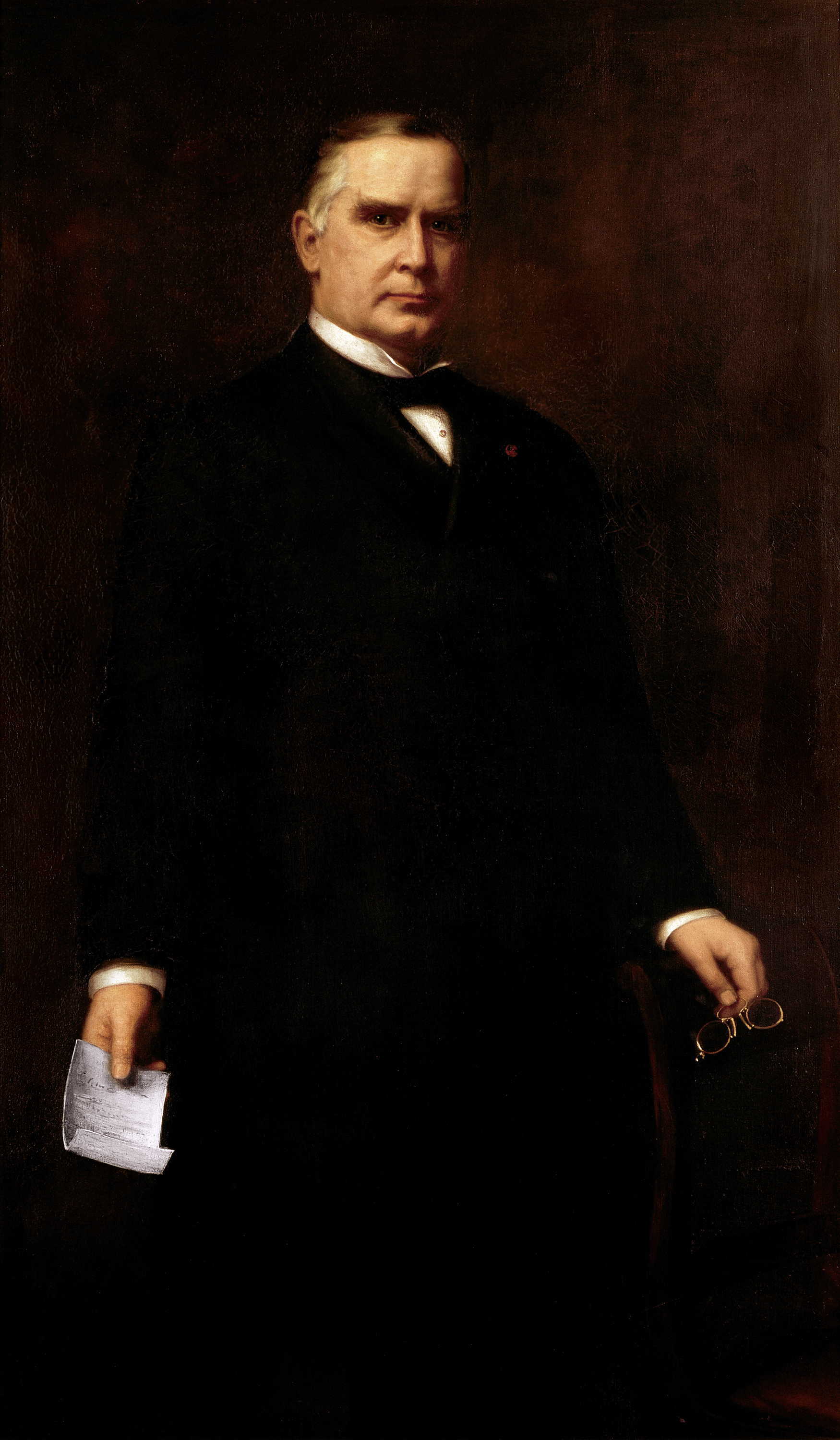
Portrait of William McKinley by Harriet Anderson Stubbs Murphy, 1902

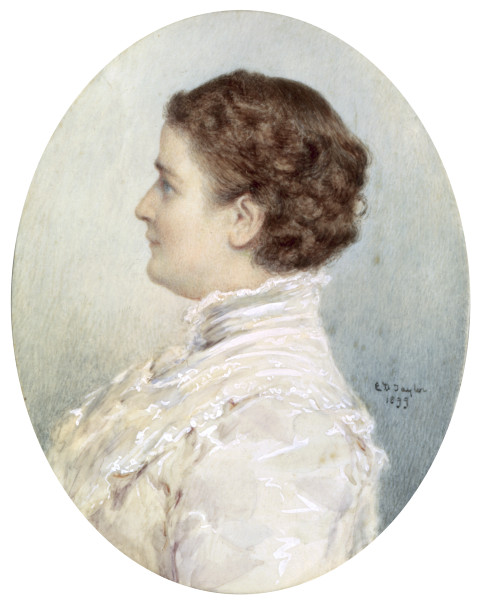
Portrait of Ida McKinley by Emily Drayton Taylor, 1899

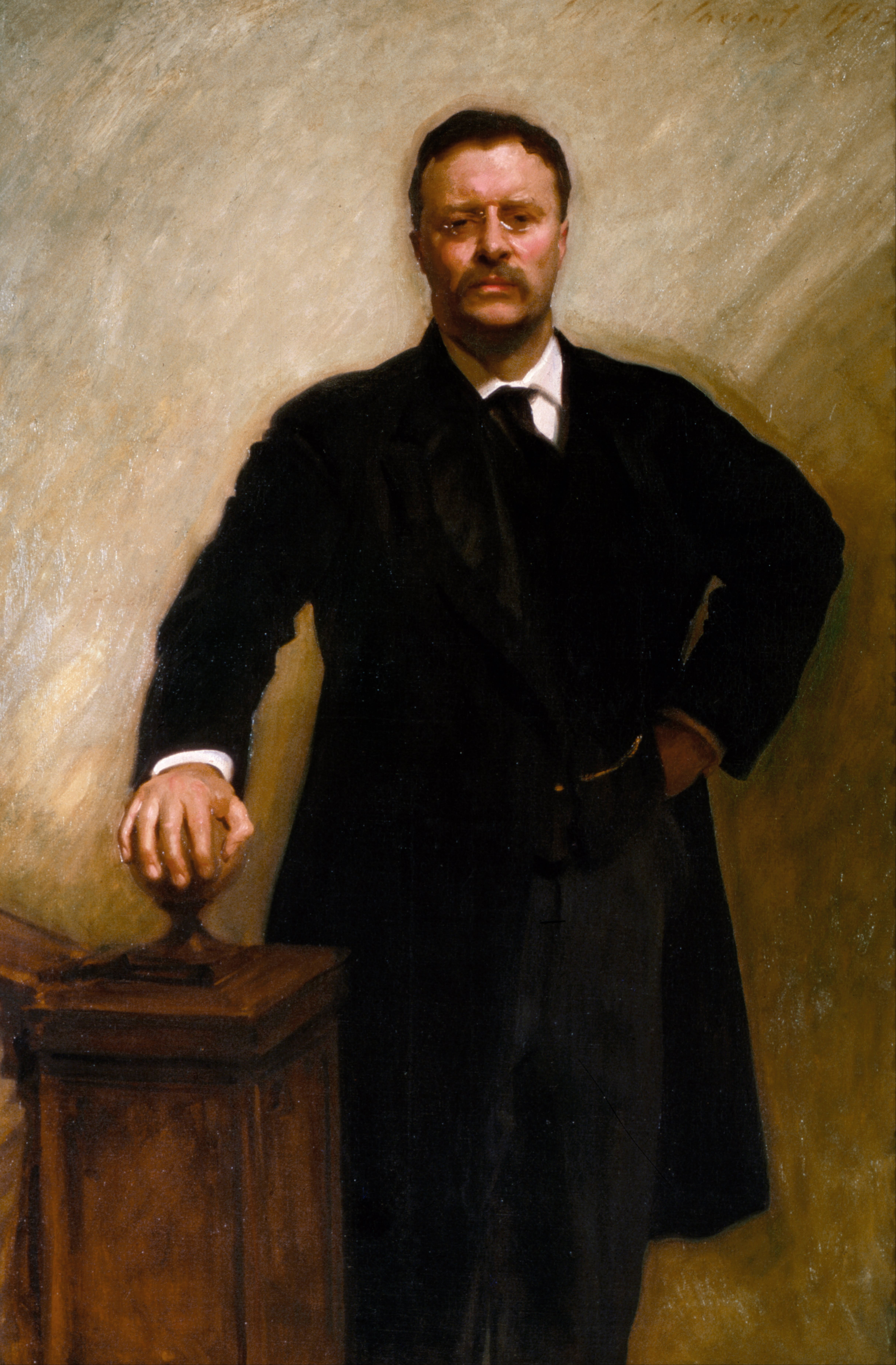
Portrait of Theodore Roosevelt by John Singer Sargent, 1902

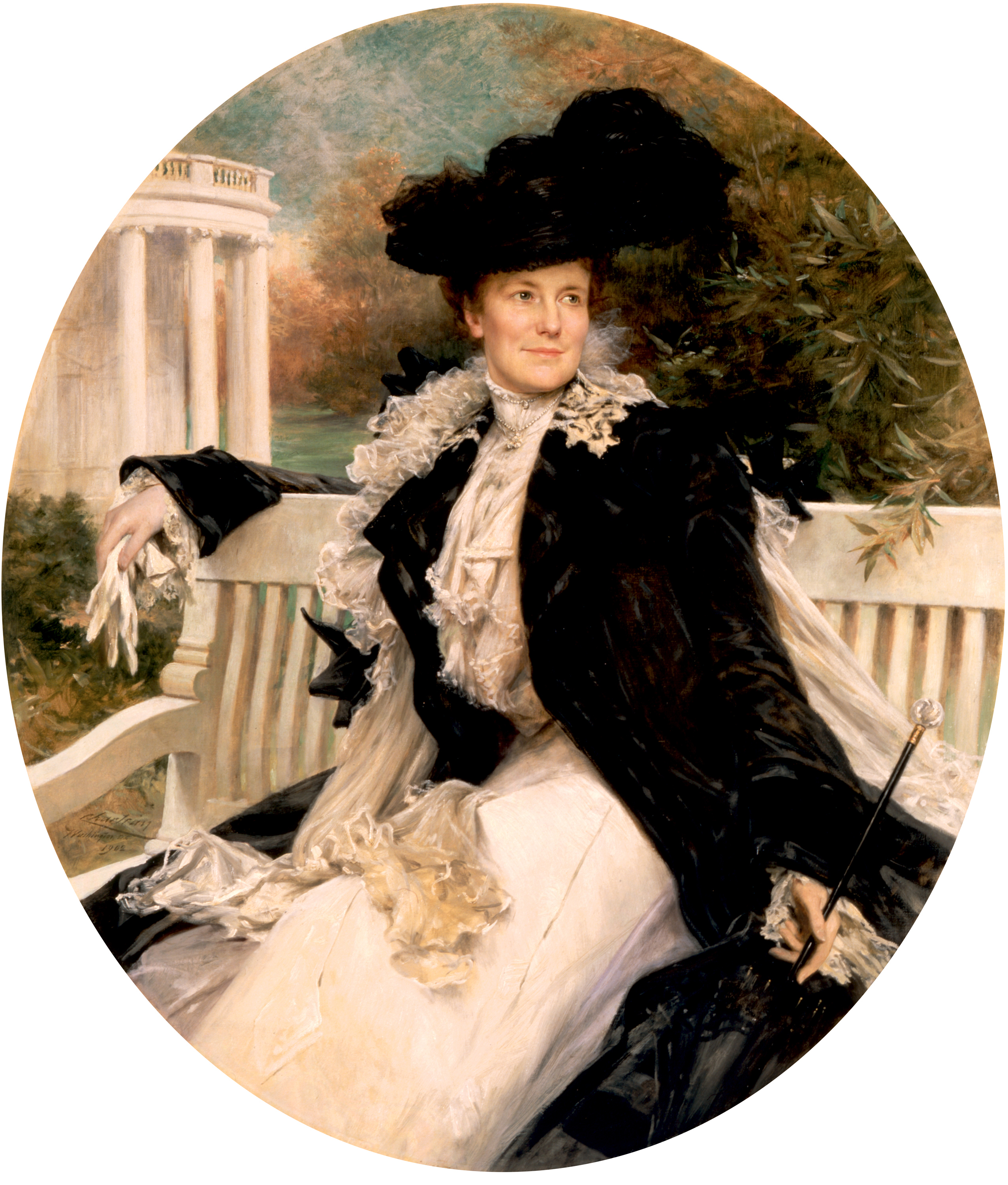
Portrait of Edith Roosevelt by Théobald Chartran, 1902

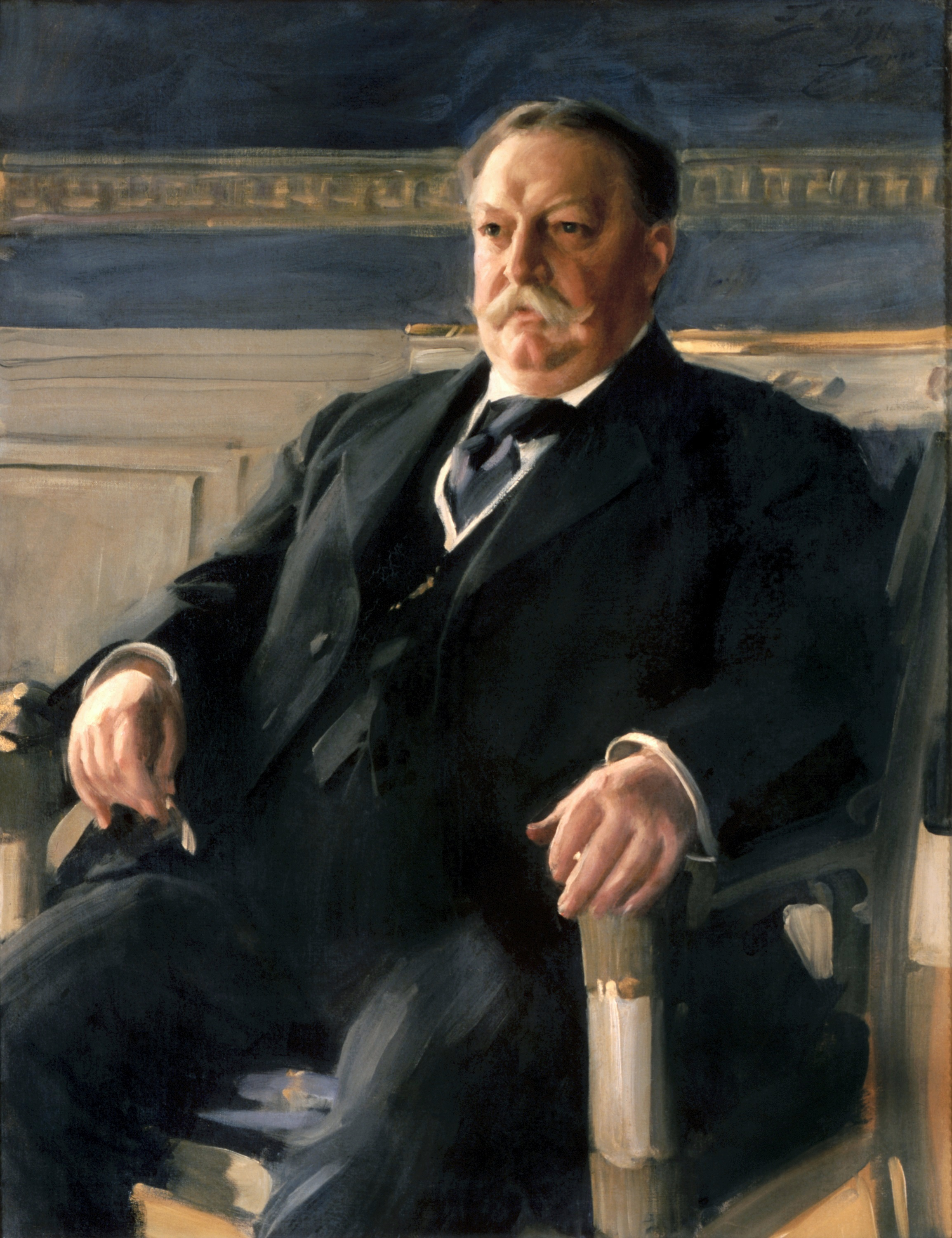
Portrait of William Howard Taft by Anders Zorn, 1911

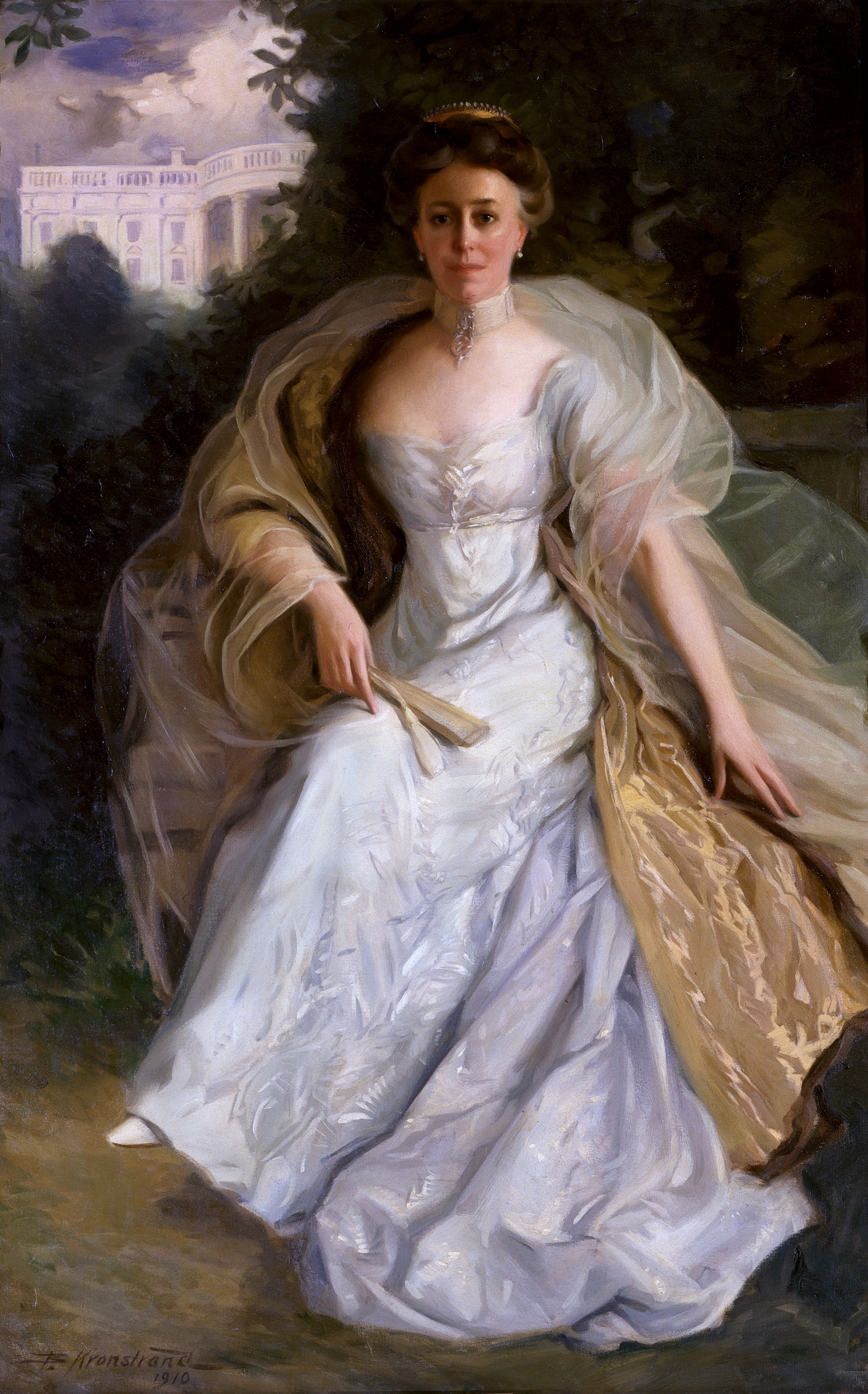
Portrait of Helen Taft by Bror Kronstrand, 1910

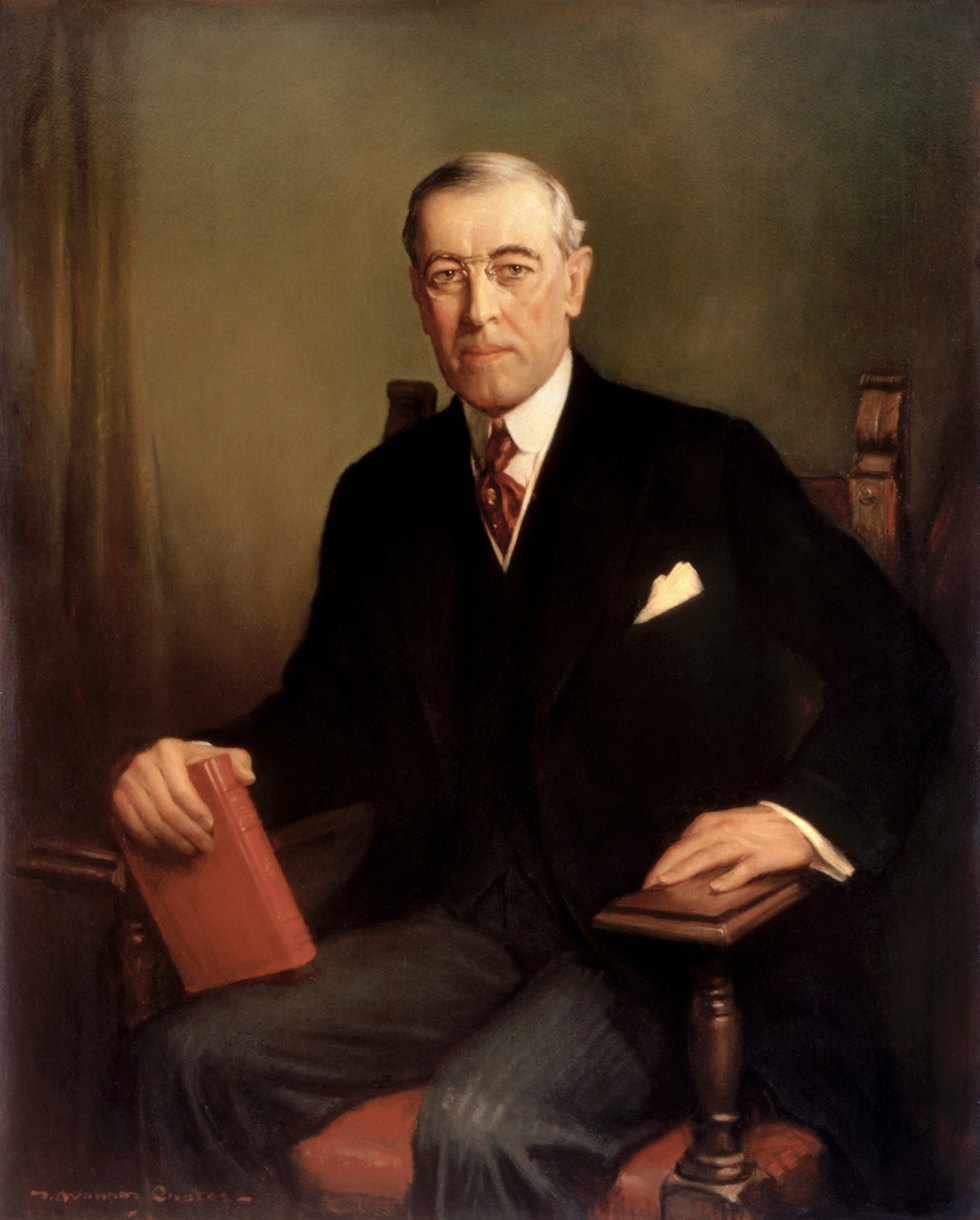
Portrait of Woodrow Wilson by Frank Graham Cootes, 1936

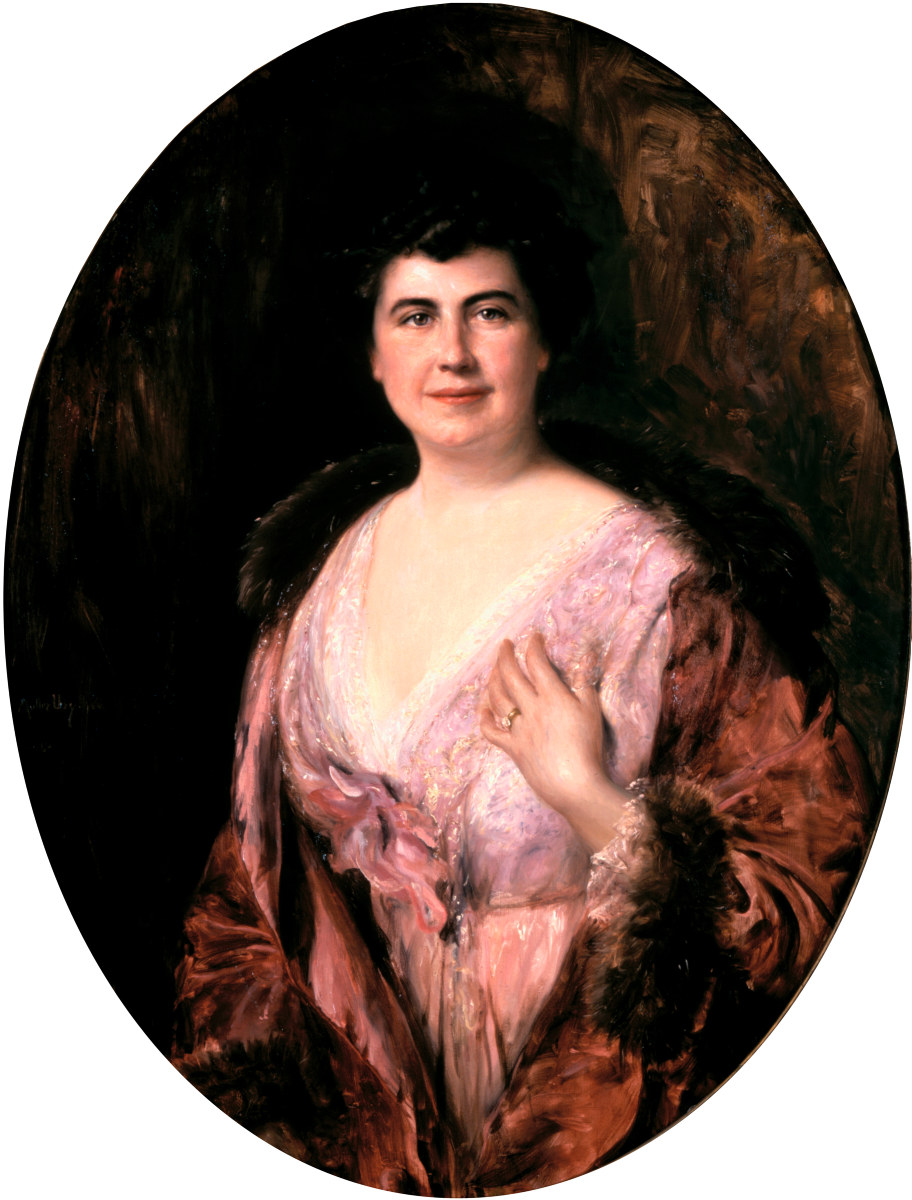
Portrait of Edith Wilson by Adolfo Müller-Ury, 1916

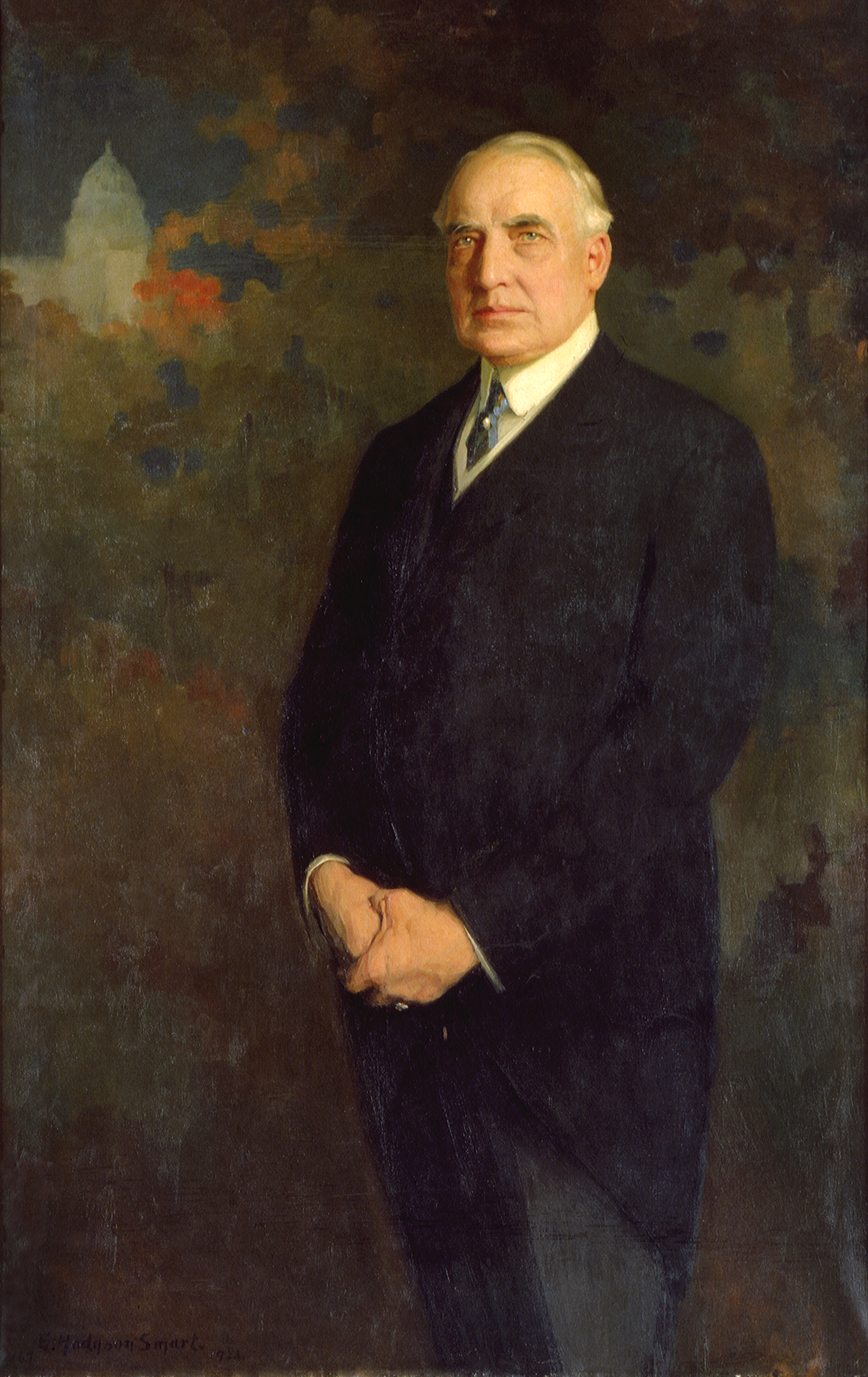
Portrait of Warren G. Harding by Edmund Hodgson Smart, 1923

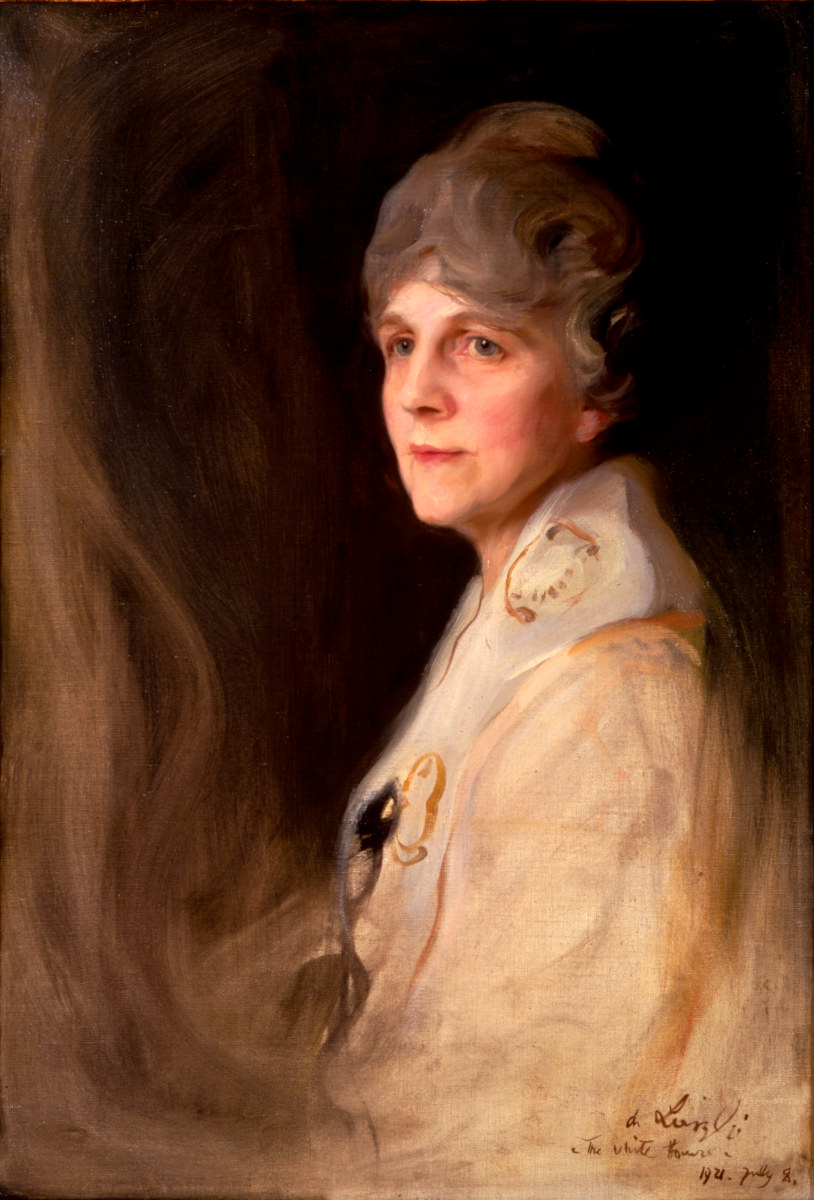
Portrait of Florence Kling Harding by Philip de László, 1921

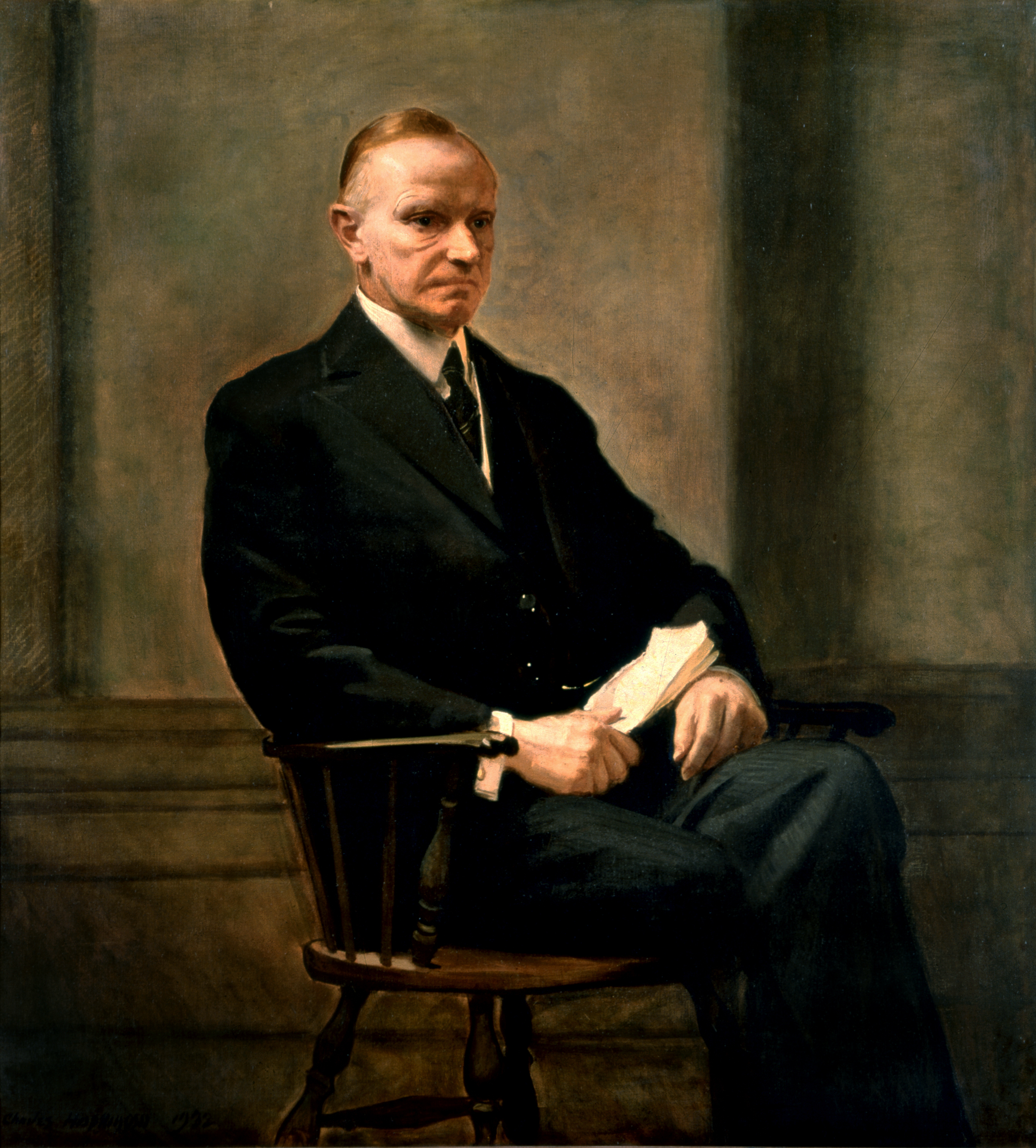
Portrait of Calvin Coolidge by Charles S. Hopkinson, 1932

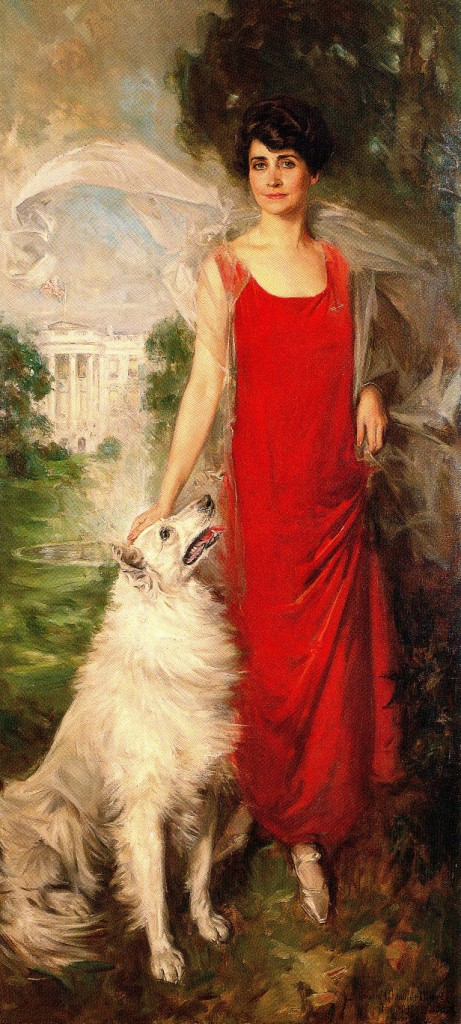
Portrait of Grace Goodhue Coolidge by Howard Chandler Christy, 1924

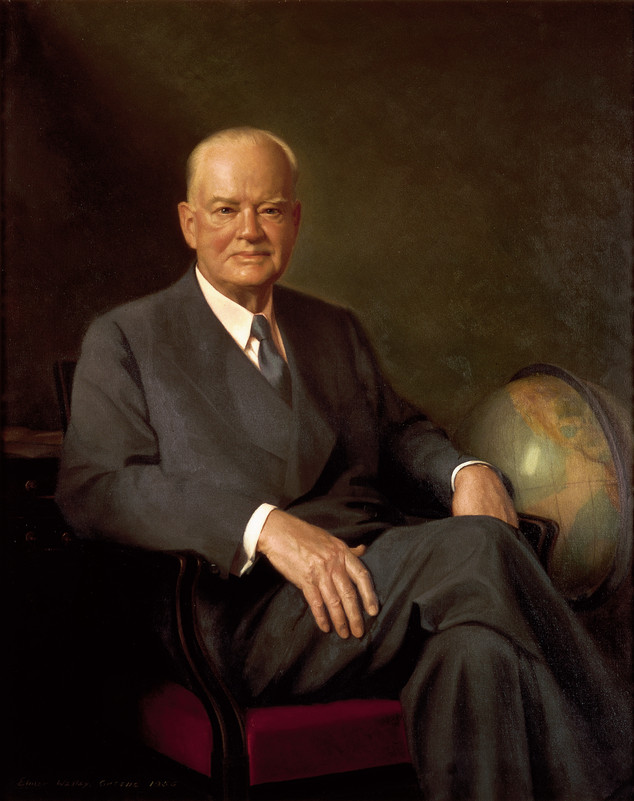
Portrait of Herbert Hoover by Elmer Wesley Greene, 1956

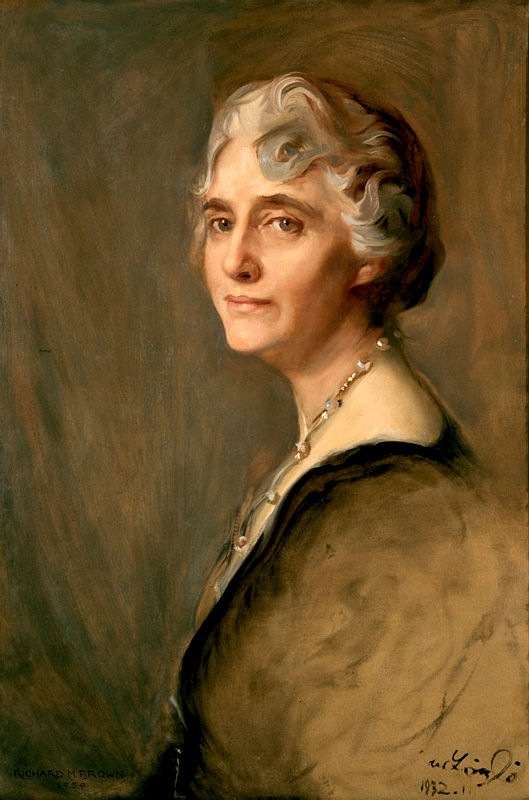
Portrait of Lou Henry Hoover by Richard Marsden Brown, 1950

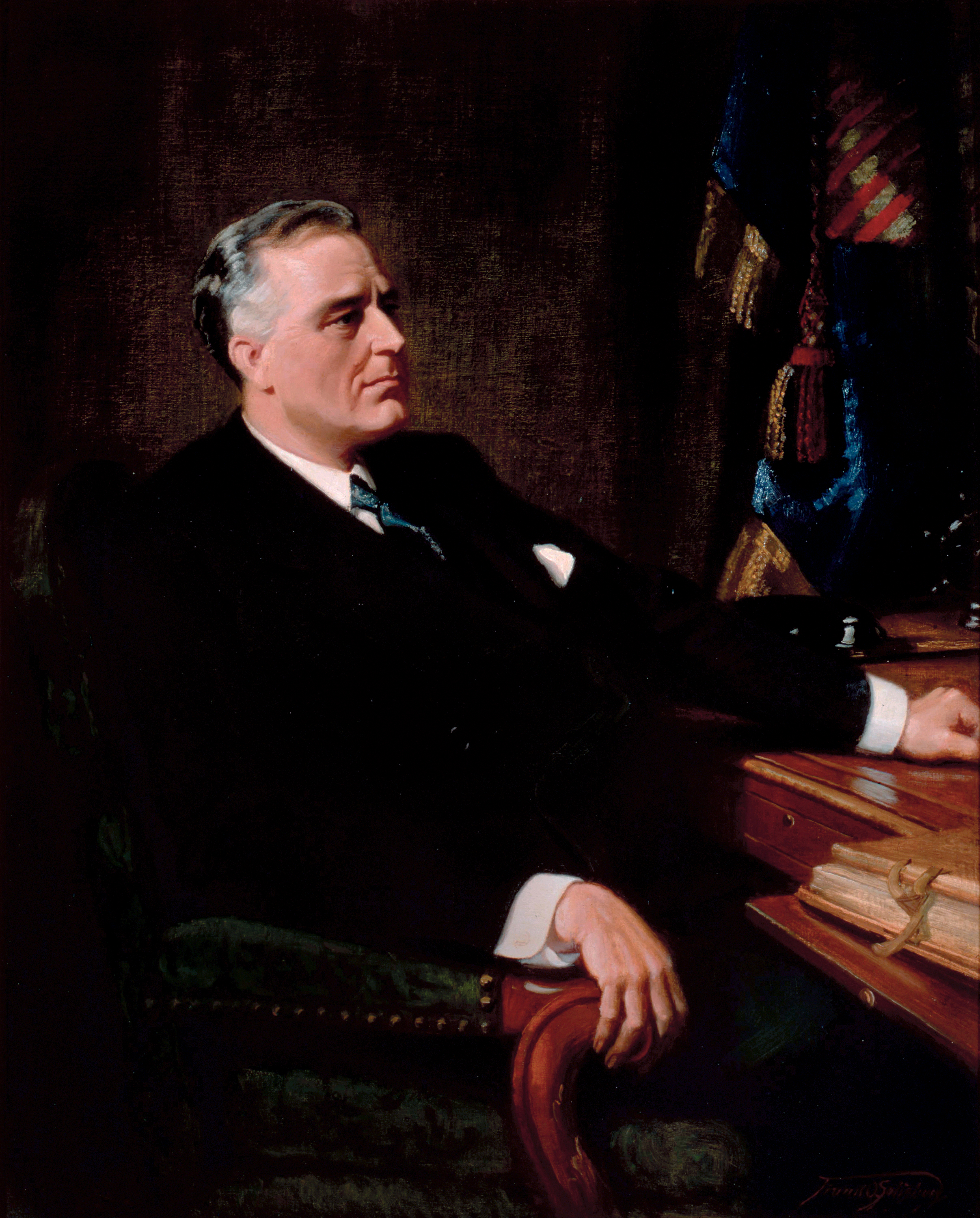
Portrait of Franklin D. Roosevelt by Frank O. Salisbury, 1947

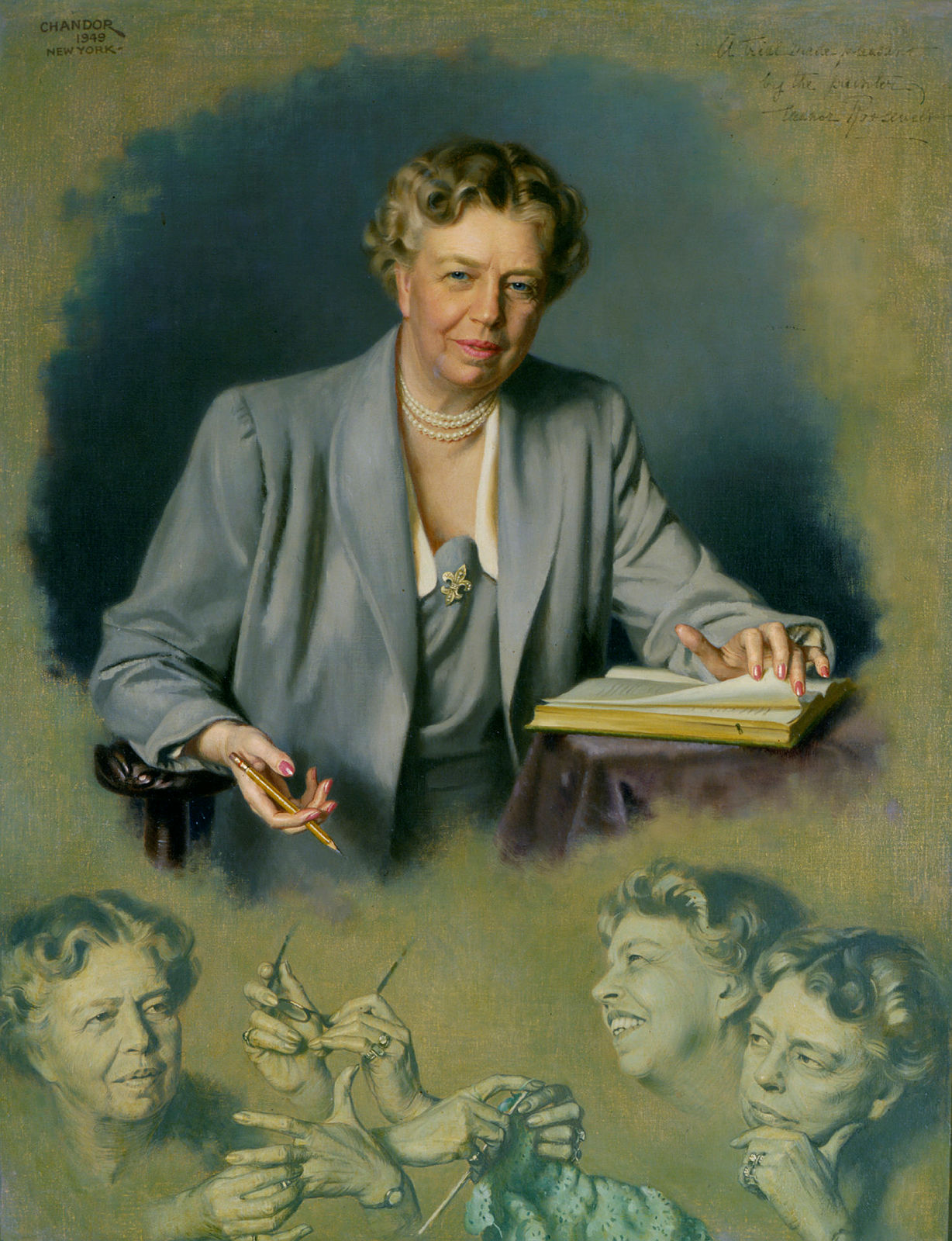
Portrait of Eleanor Roosevelt by Douglas Chandor, 1949

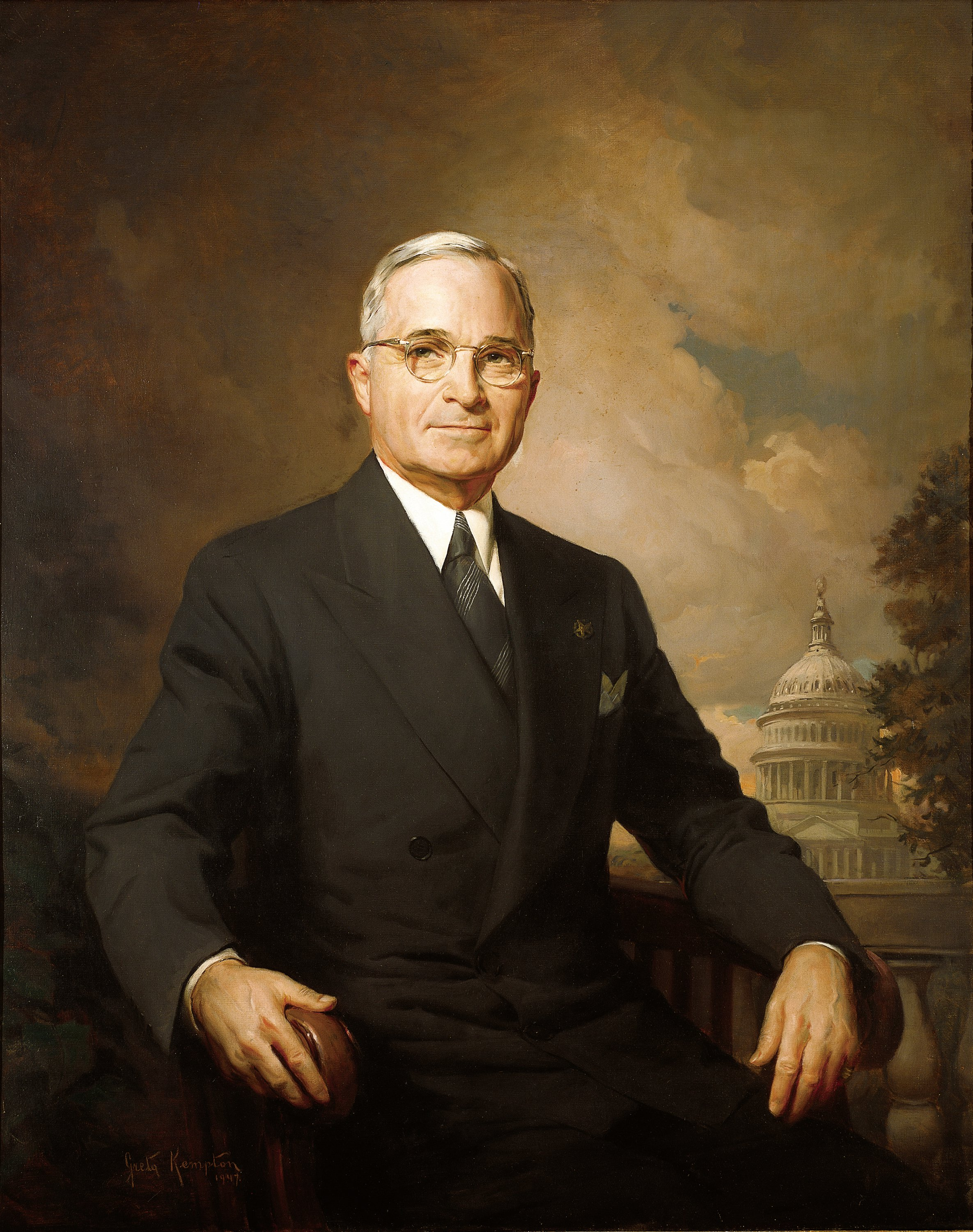
Portrait of Harry S. Truman by Martha Greta Kempton, 1947

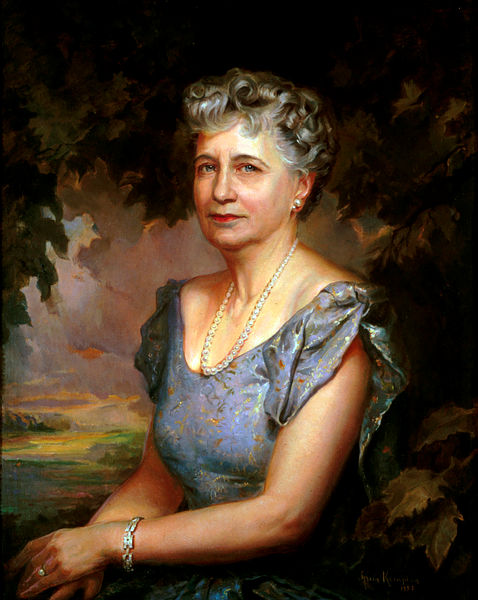
Portrait of Elizabeth Truman by Martha Greta Kempton, 1967

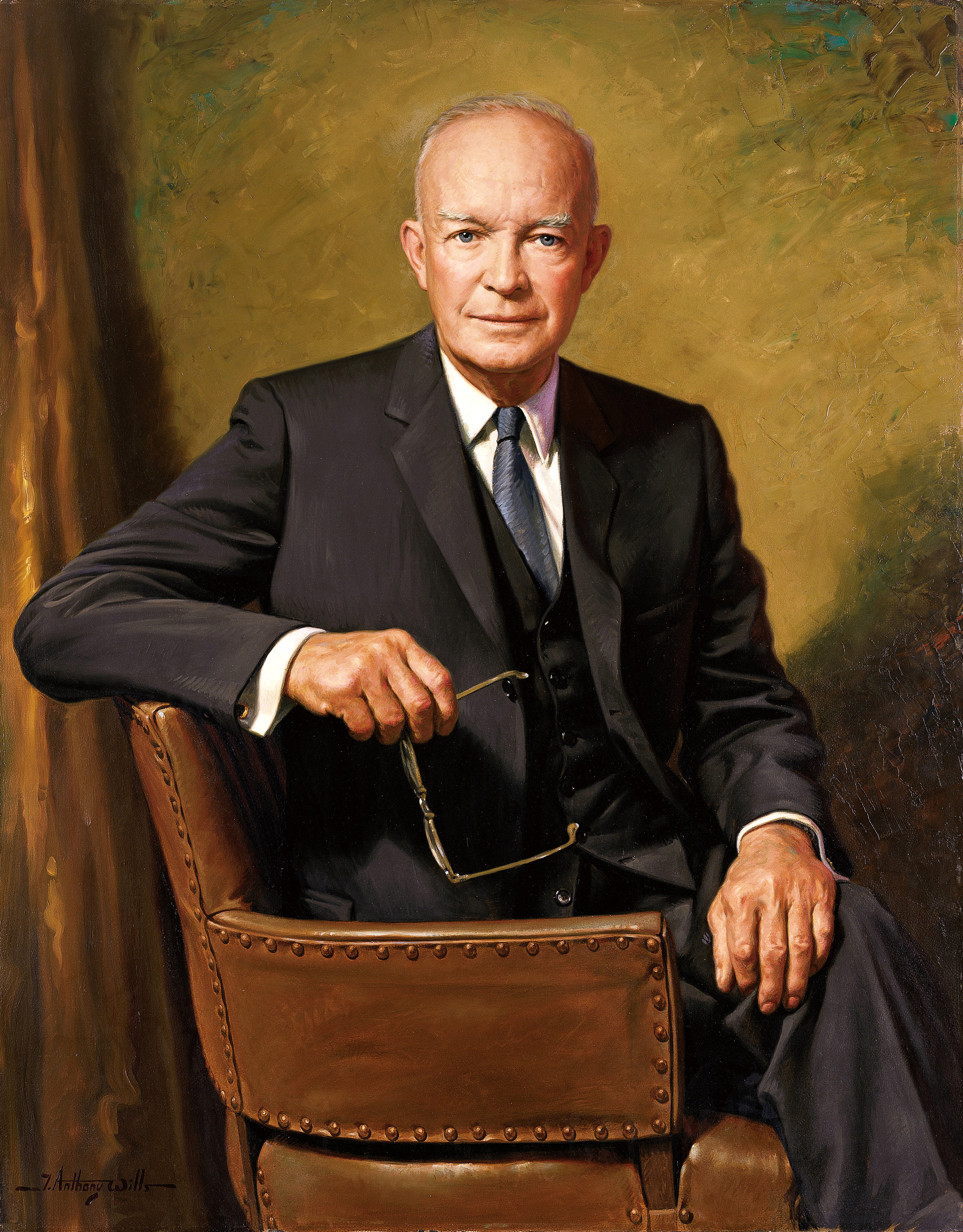
Portrait of Dwight D. Eisenhower by James Anthony Wills, 1967

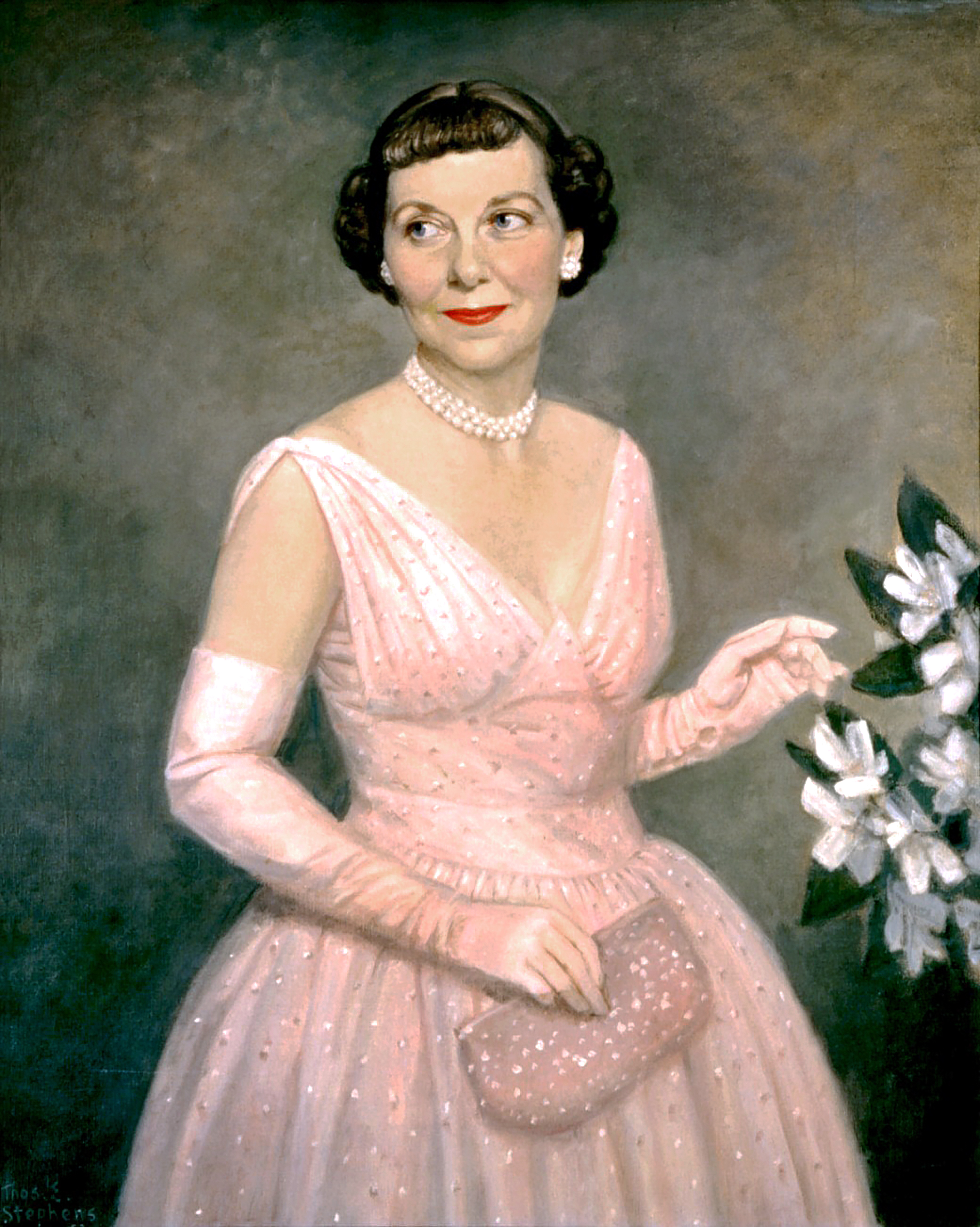
Portrait of Mamie Doud Eisenhower by Thomas Edgar Stephens, 1959

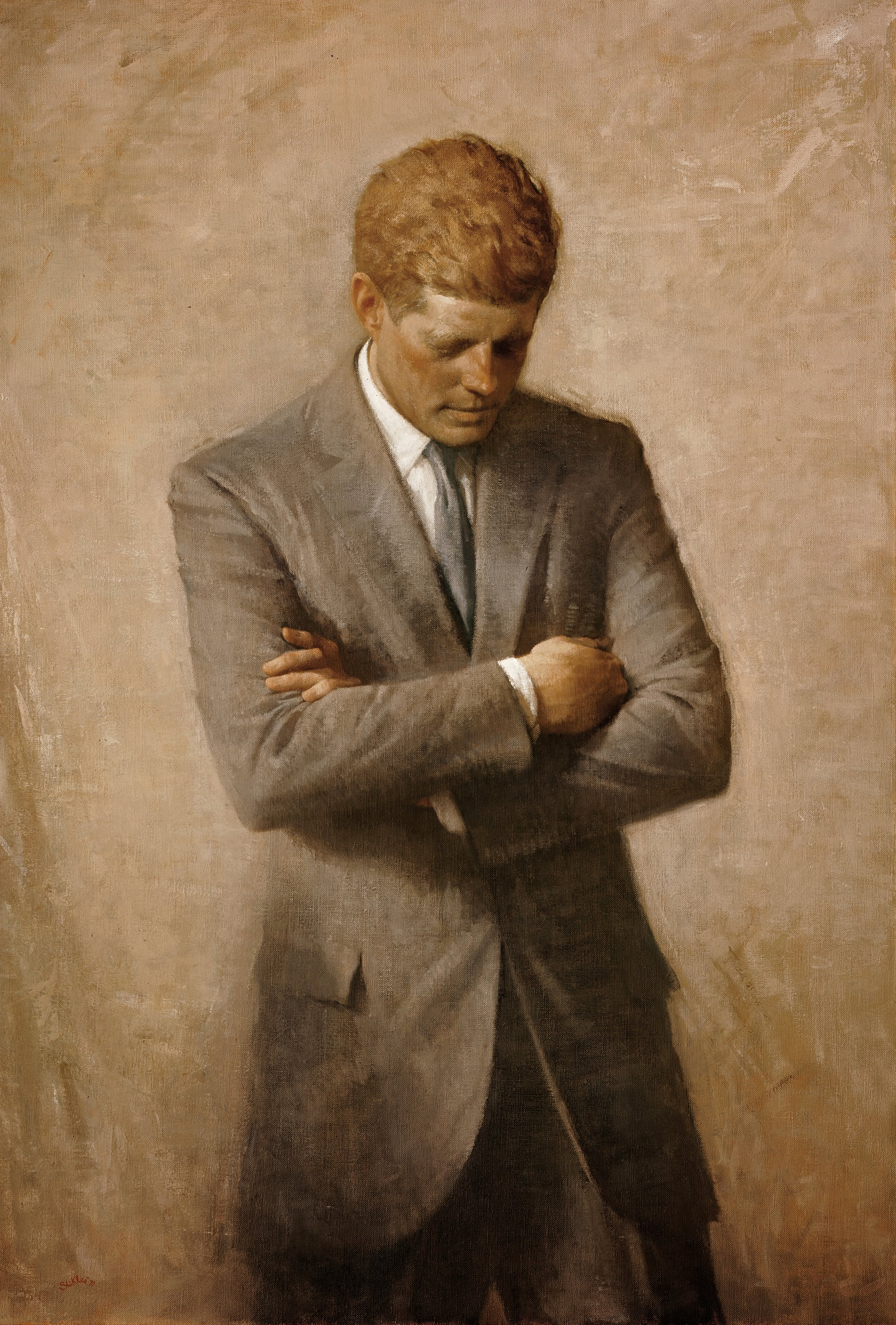
Portrait of John F. Kennedy by Aaron Shikler, 1970

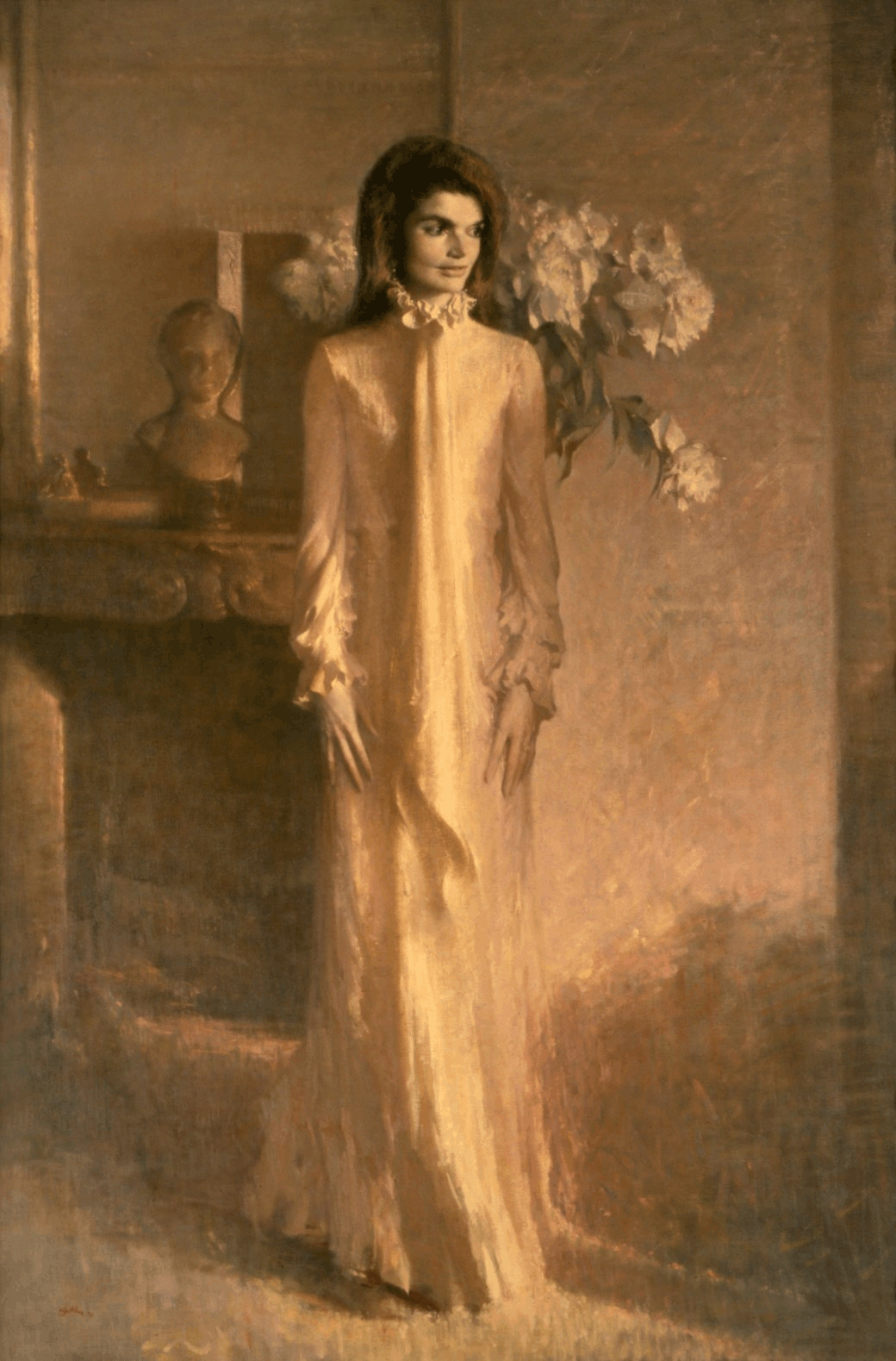
Portrait of Jacqueline Bouvier Kennedy by Aaron Shikler, 1970

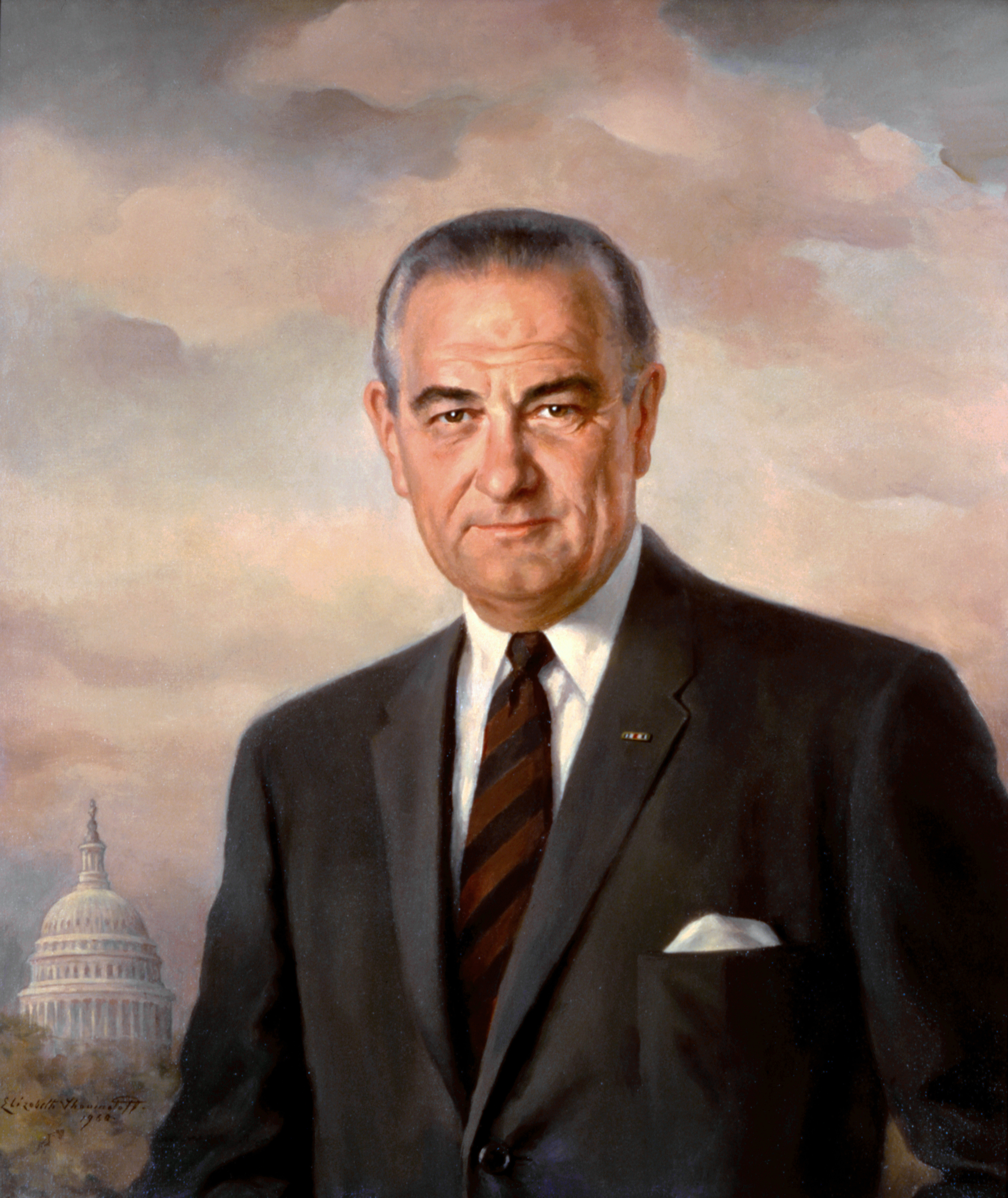
Portrait of Lyndon B. Johnson by Elizabeth Shoumatoff, 1968

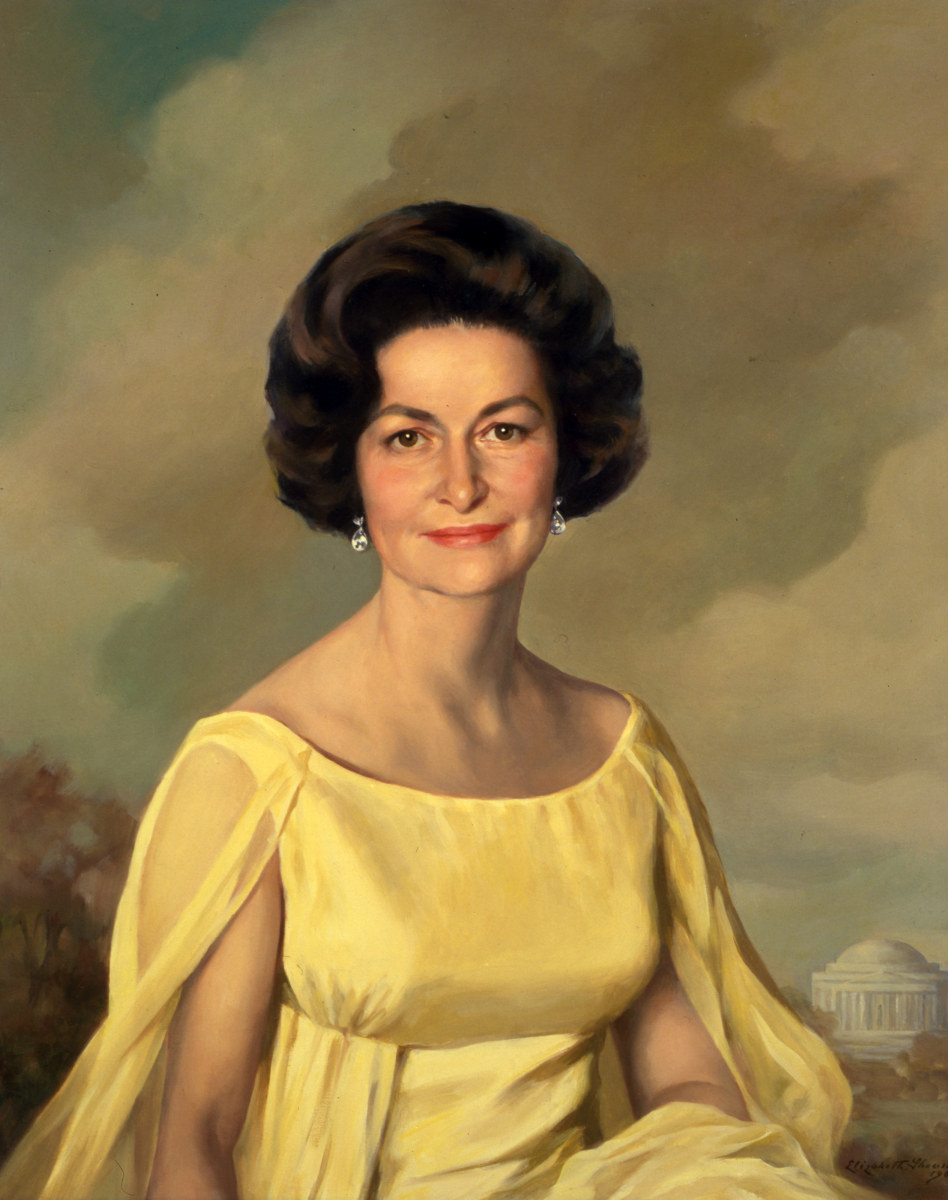
Portrait of Lady Bird Johnson by Elizabeth Shoumatoff, 1968

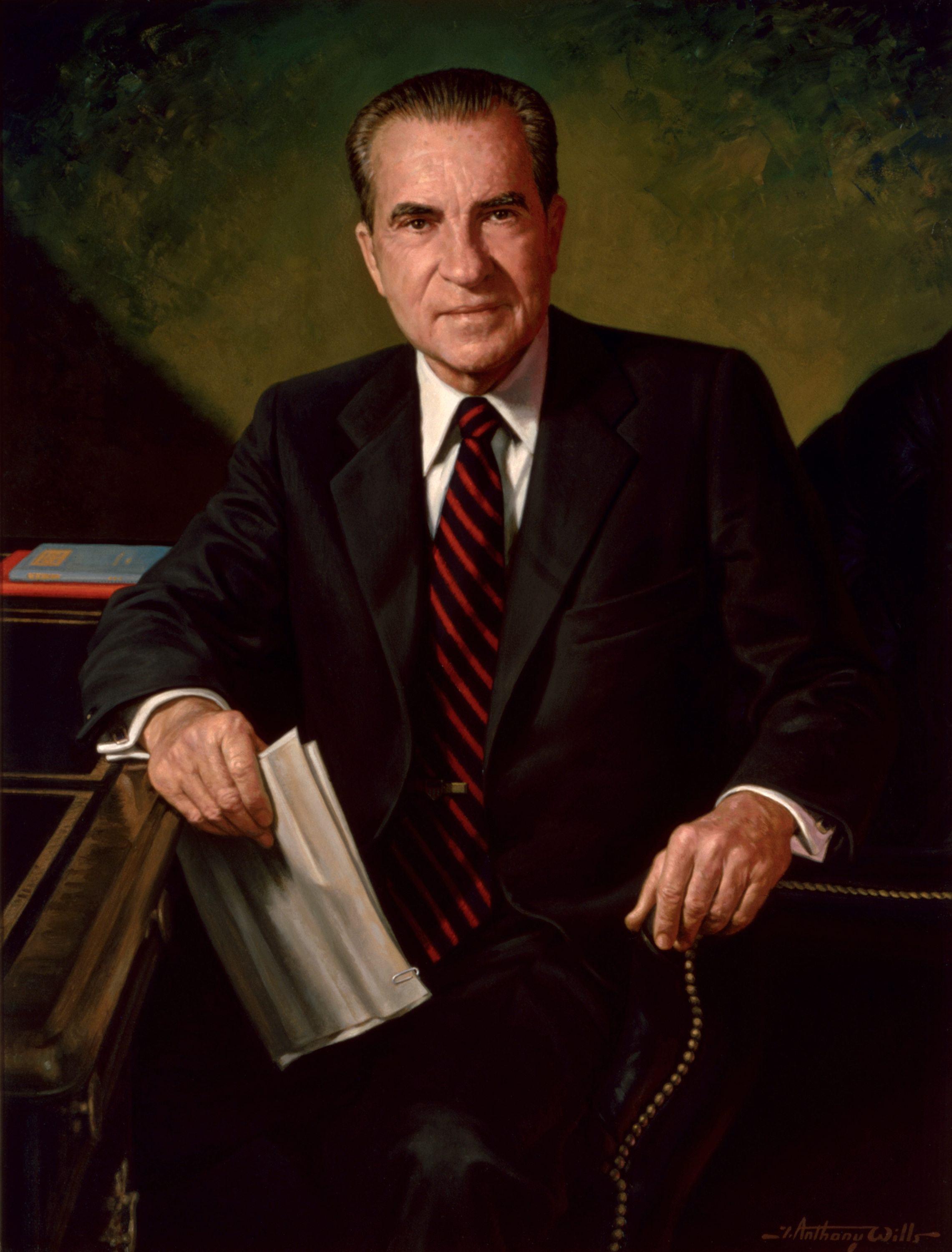
Portrait of Richard Nixon by James Anthony Wills, 1984

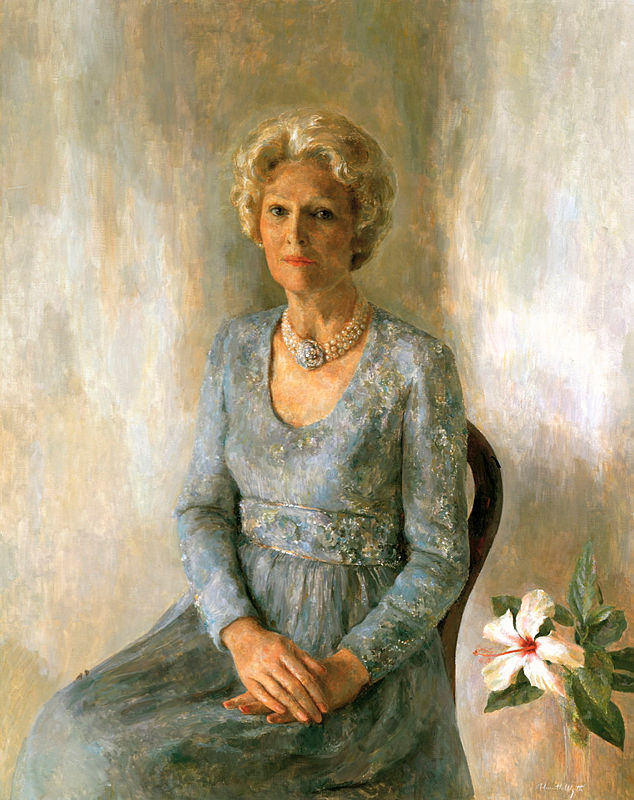
Portrait of Pat Nixon by Henriette Wyeth, 1978

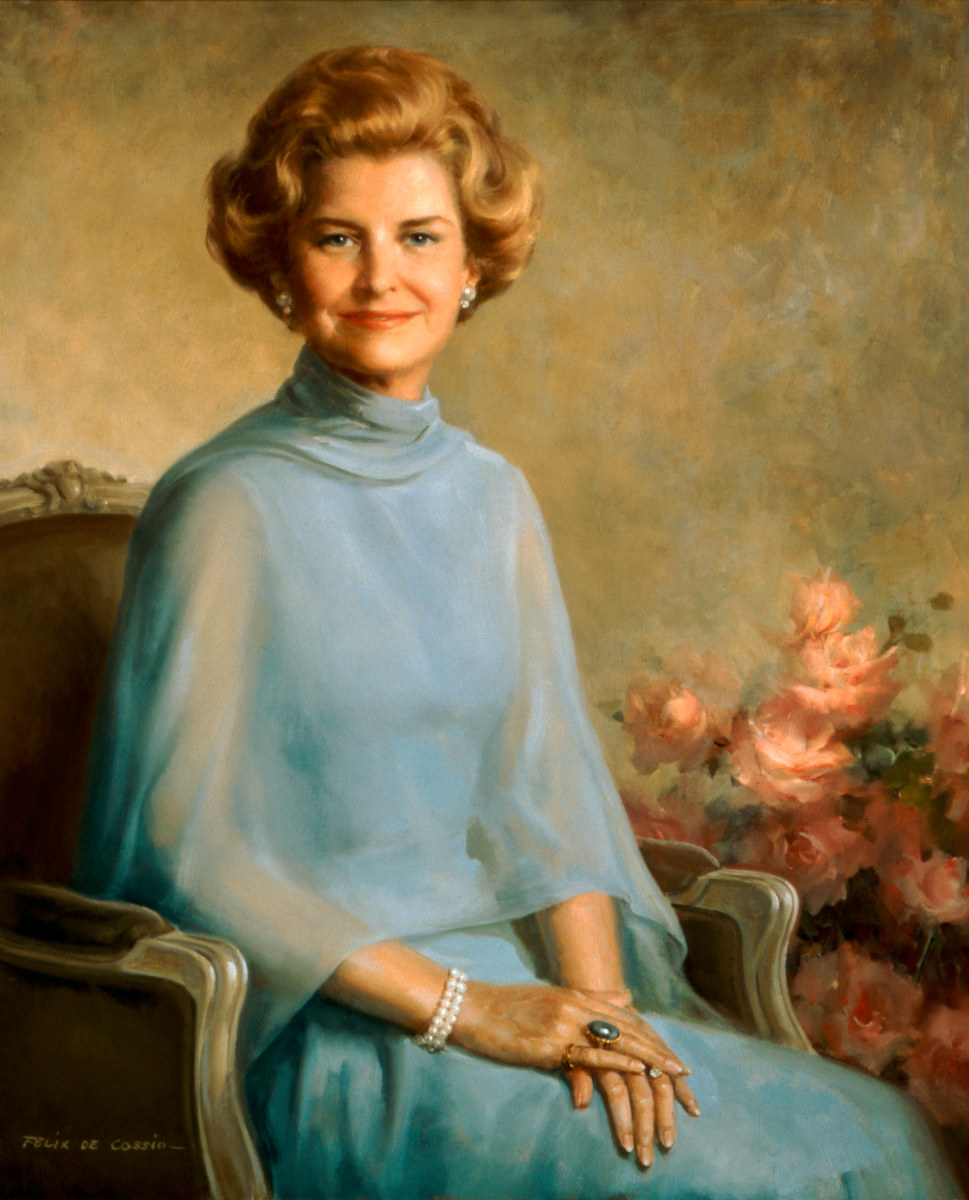
Portrait of Betty Ford by Felix de Cossio, 1977

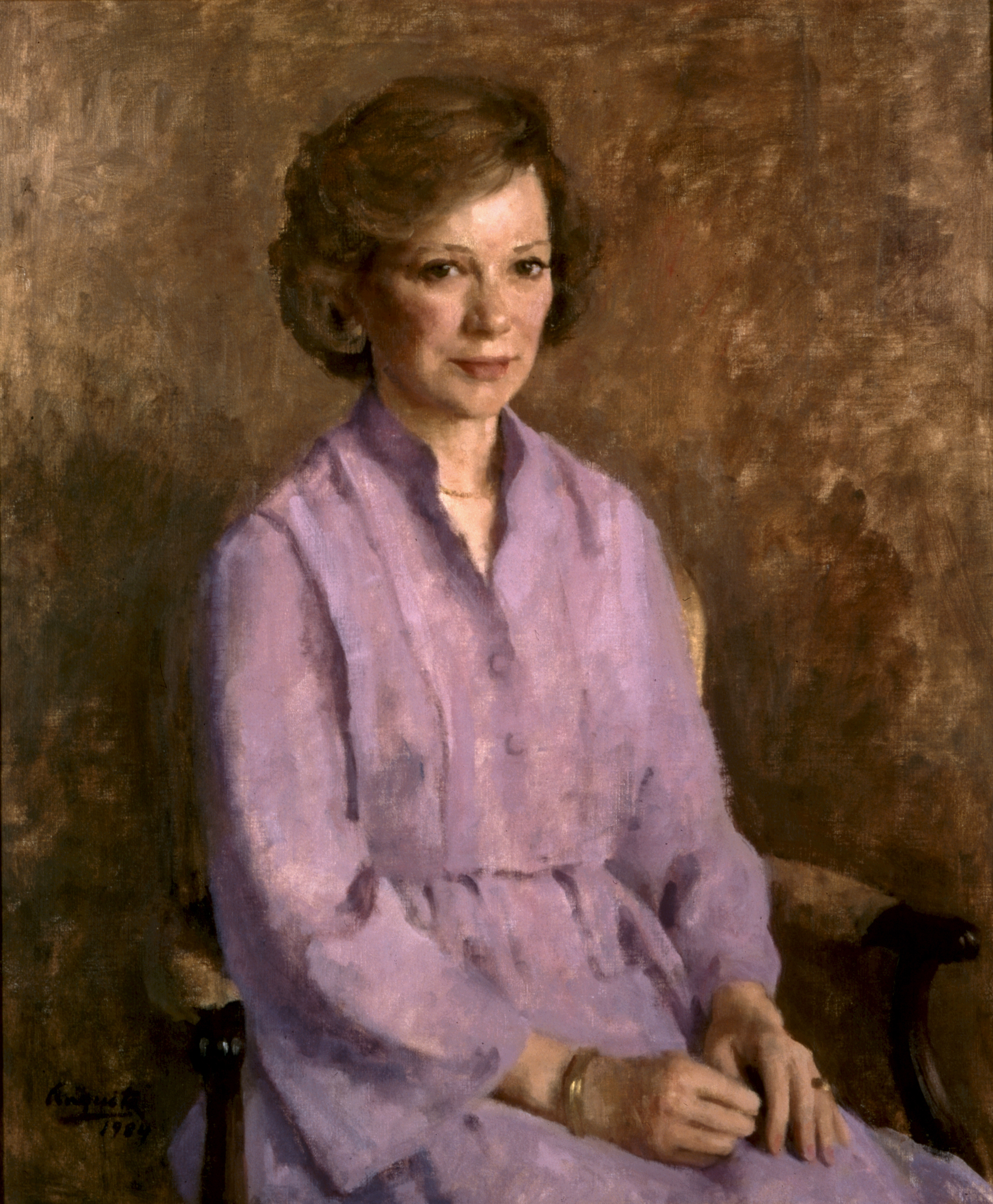
Portrait of Rosalynn Carter by George Augusta, 1984

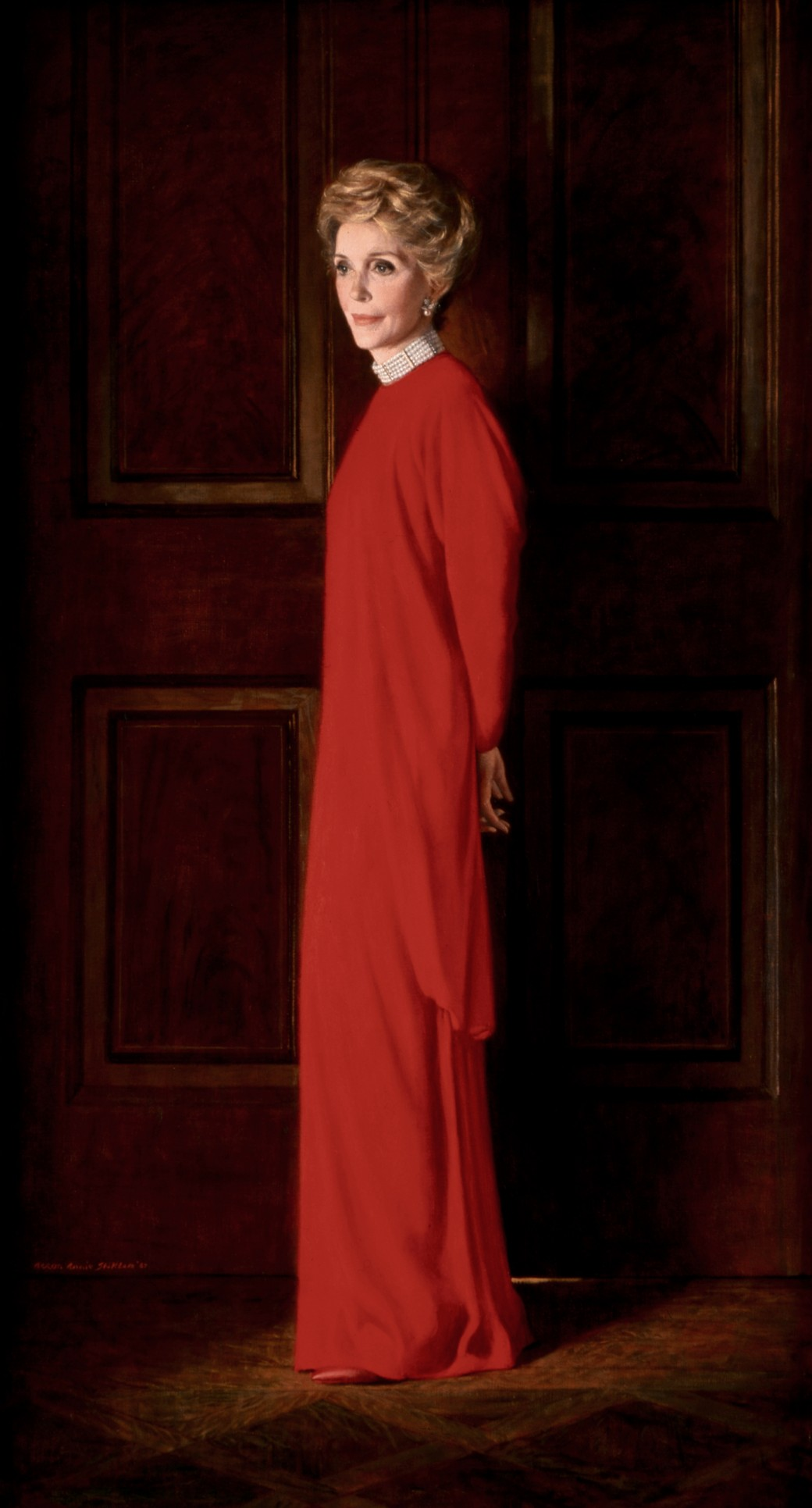
Portrait of Nancy Reagan by Aaron Shikler, 1987

=== Additional portraits ===
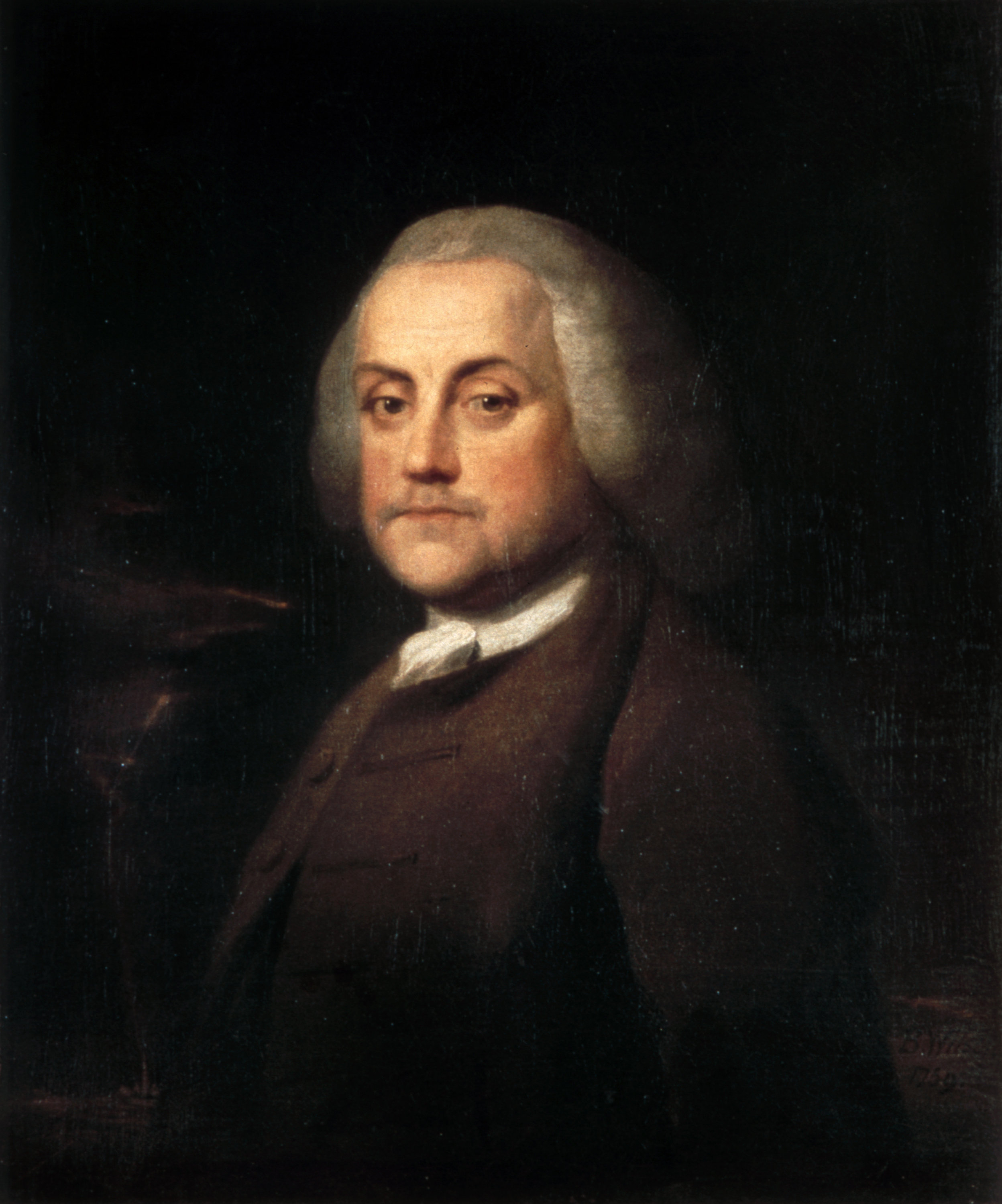
Benjamin Franklin by Benjamin Wilson, 1759

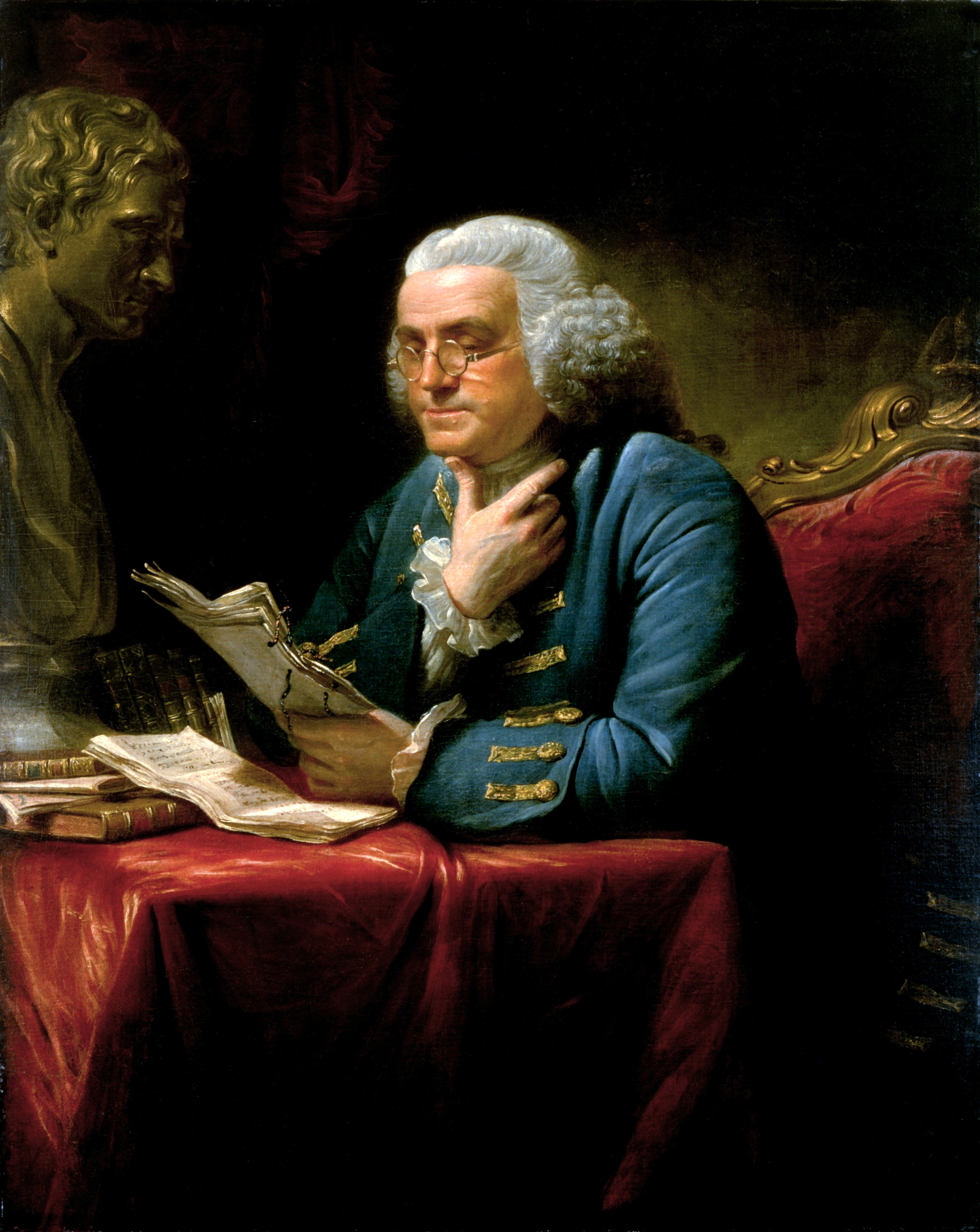
Portrait of Benjamin Franklin by David Martin, 1767

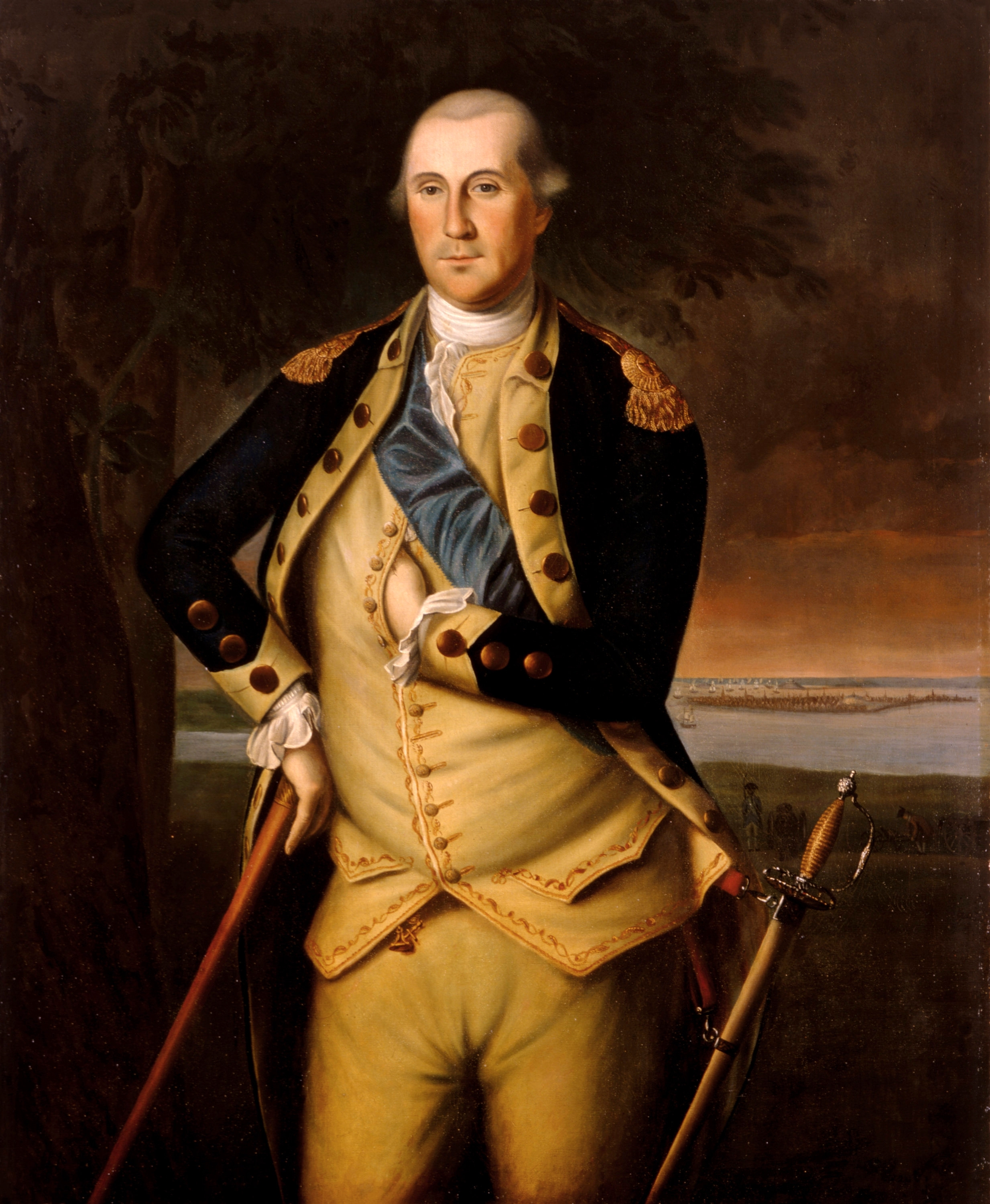
General Washington, Commander of the Continental Army by Charles Willson Peale, 1776

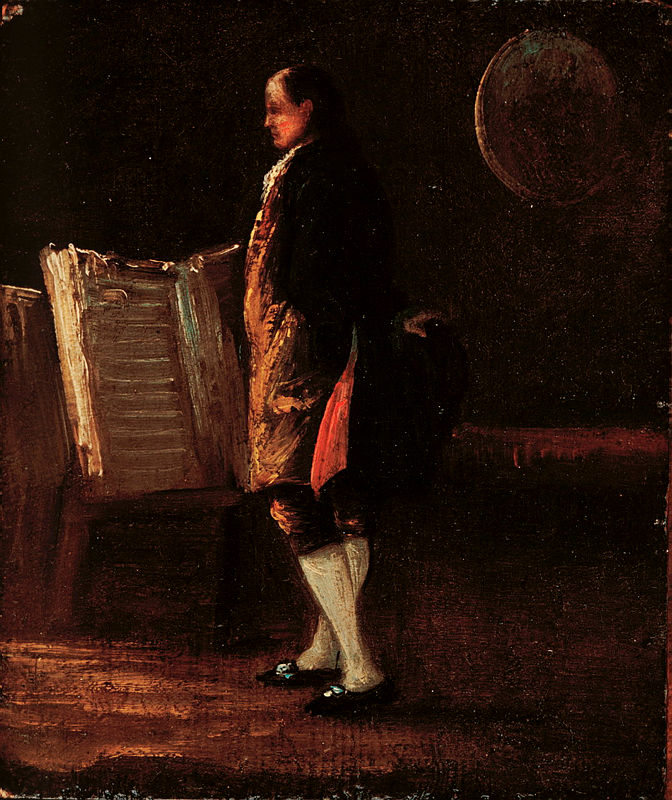
Benjamin Franklin by Gabriel de Saint-Aubin, 1777

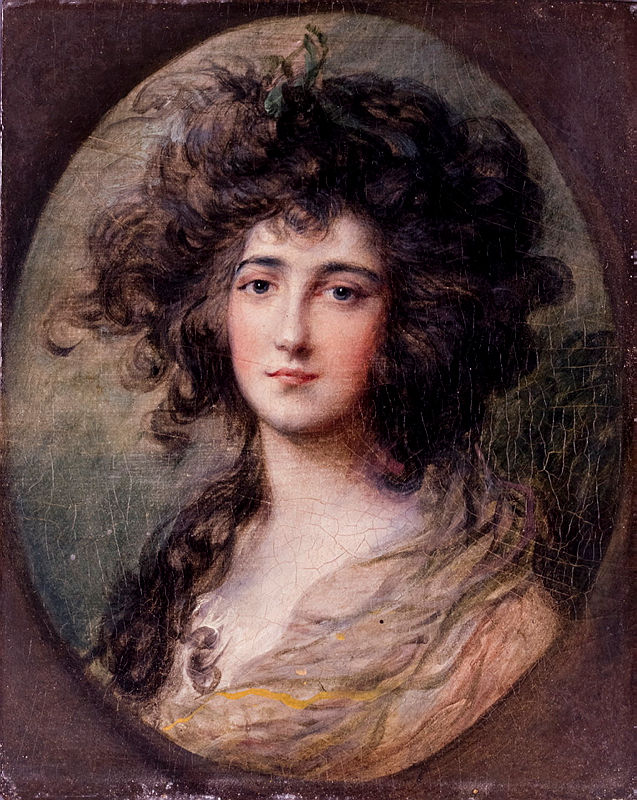
Mrs. Richard Brinsley Sheridan by Gainsborough Dupont, c. 1785

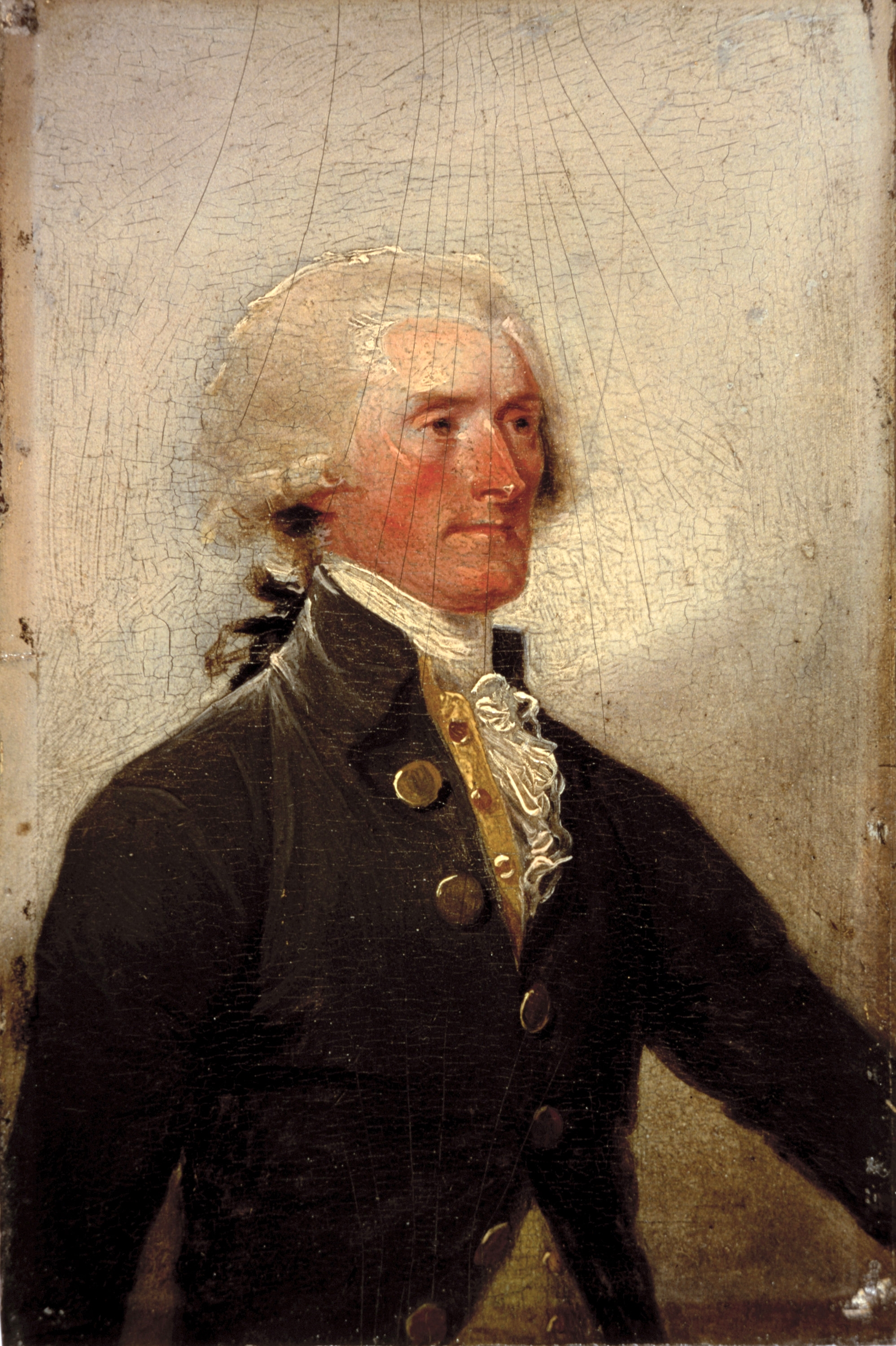
Thomas Jefferson by John Trumbull, 1788

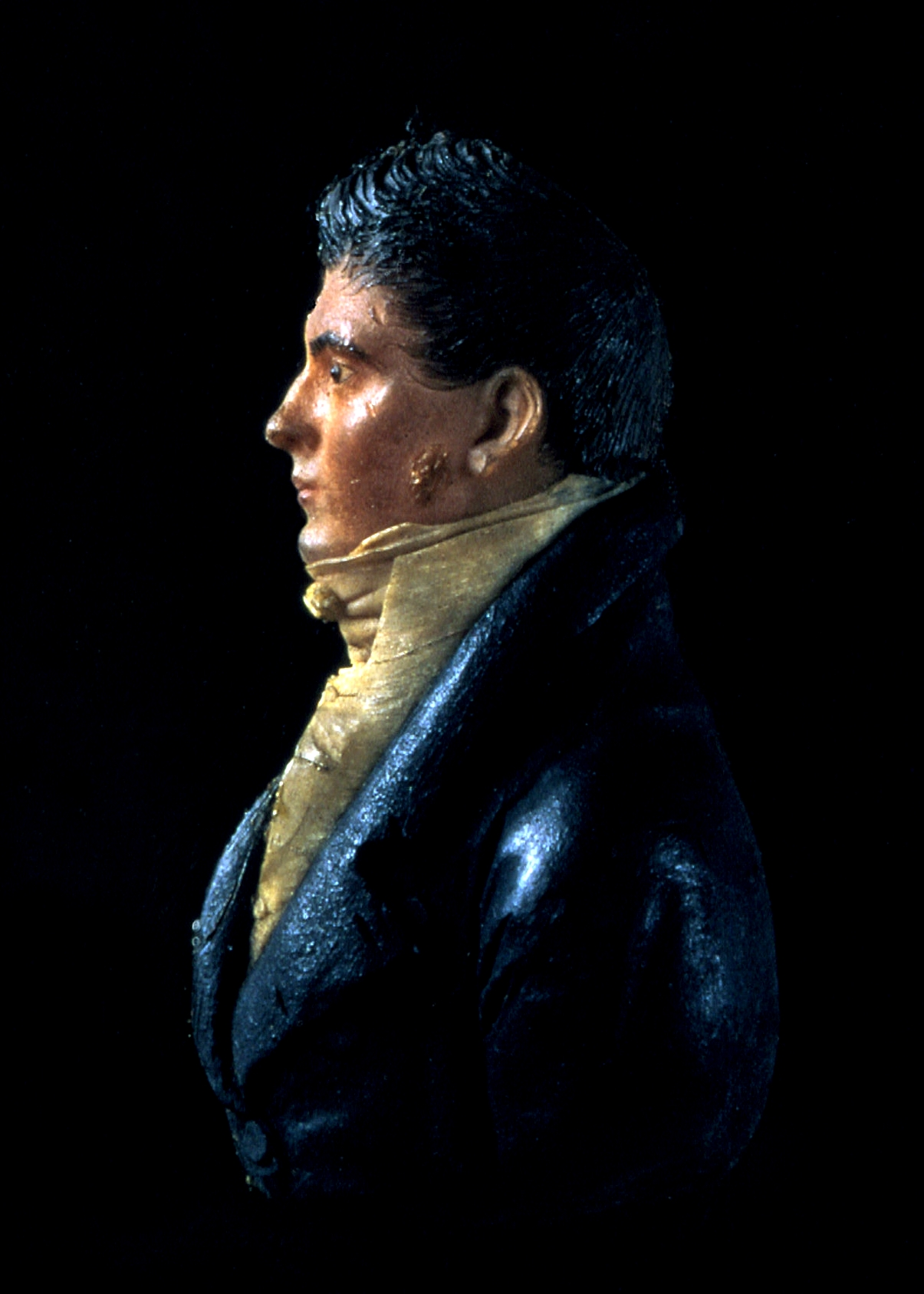
James Hoban by John Christian Rauschner, c. 1800

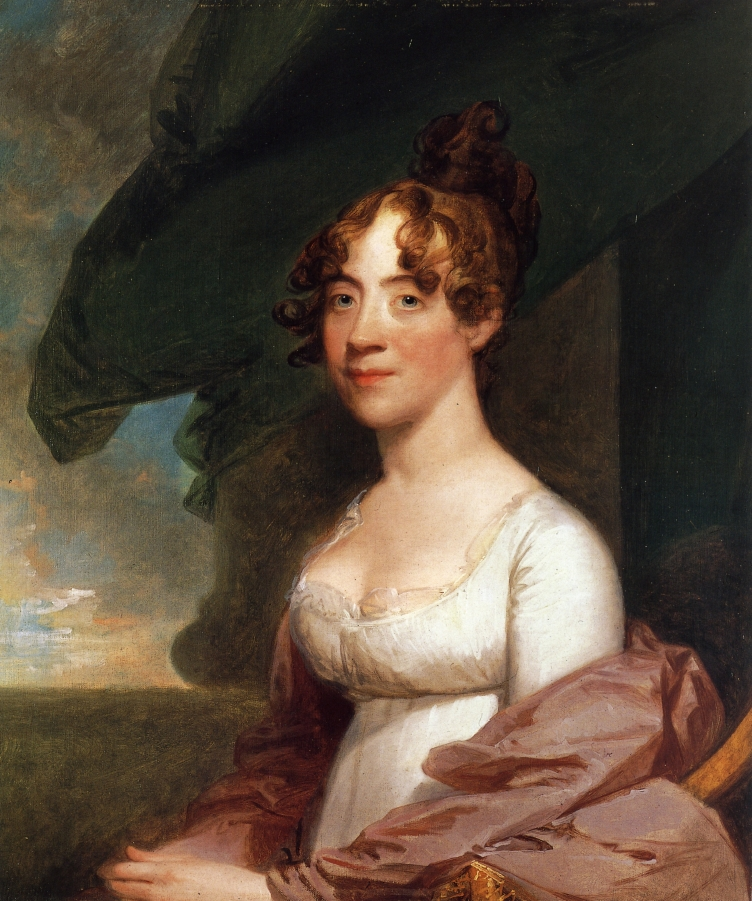
Anna Payne Cutts by Gilbert Stuart, c. 1804

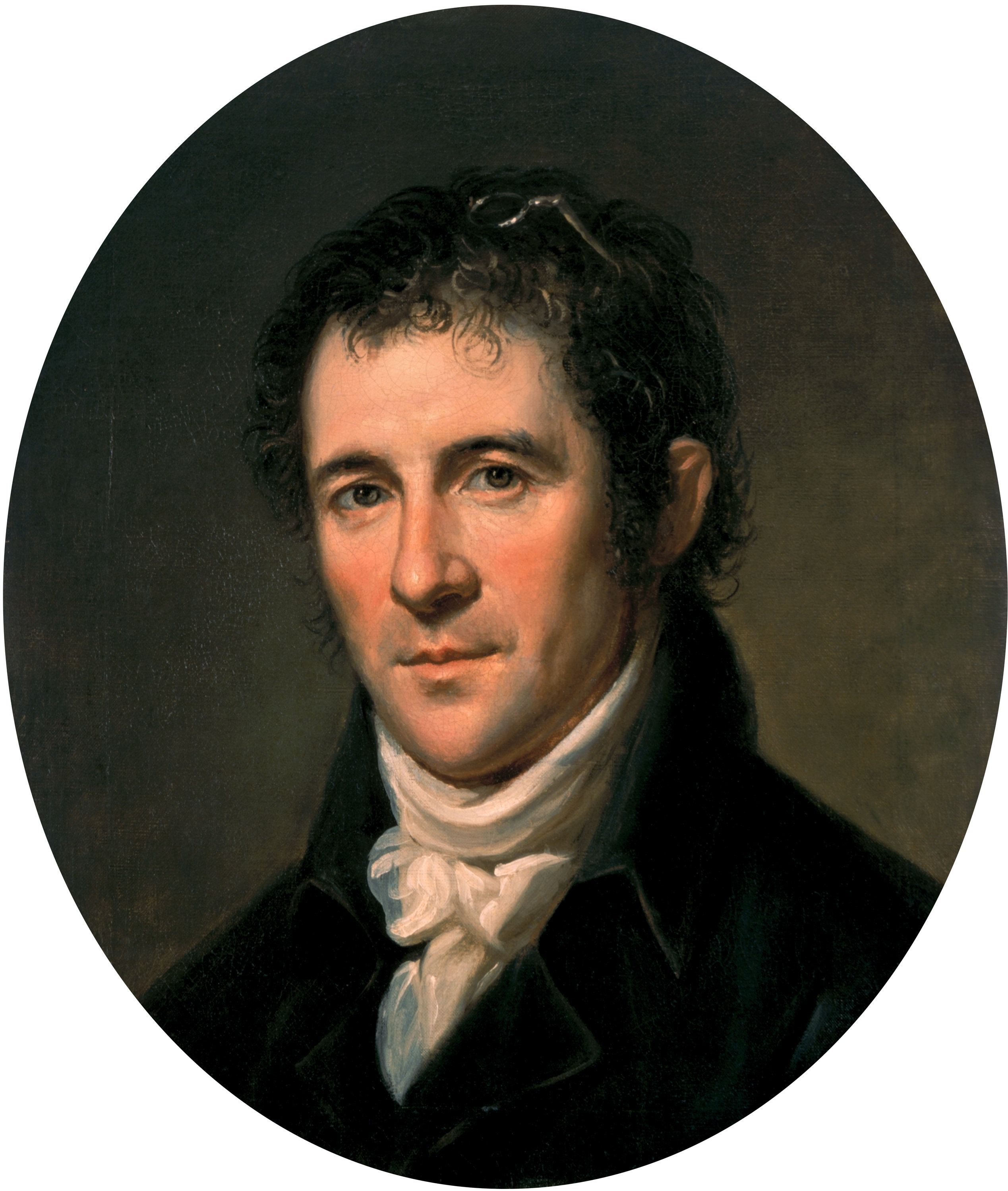
Benjamin Henry Boneval Latrobe by Charles Willson Peale, c. 1804

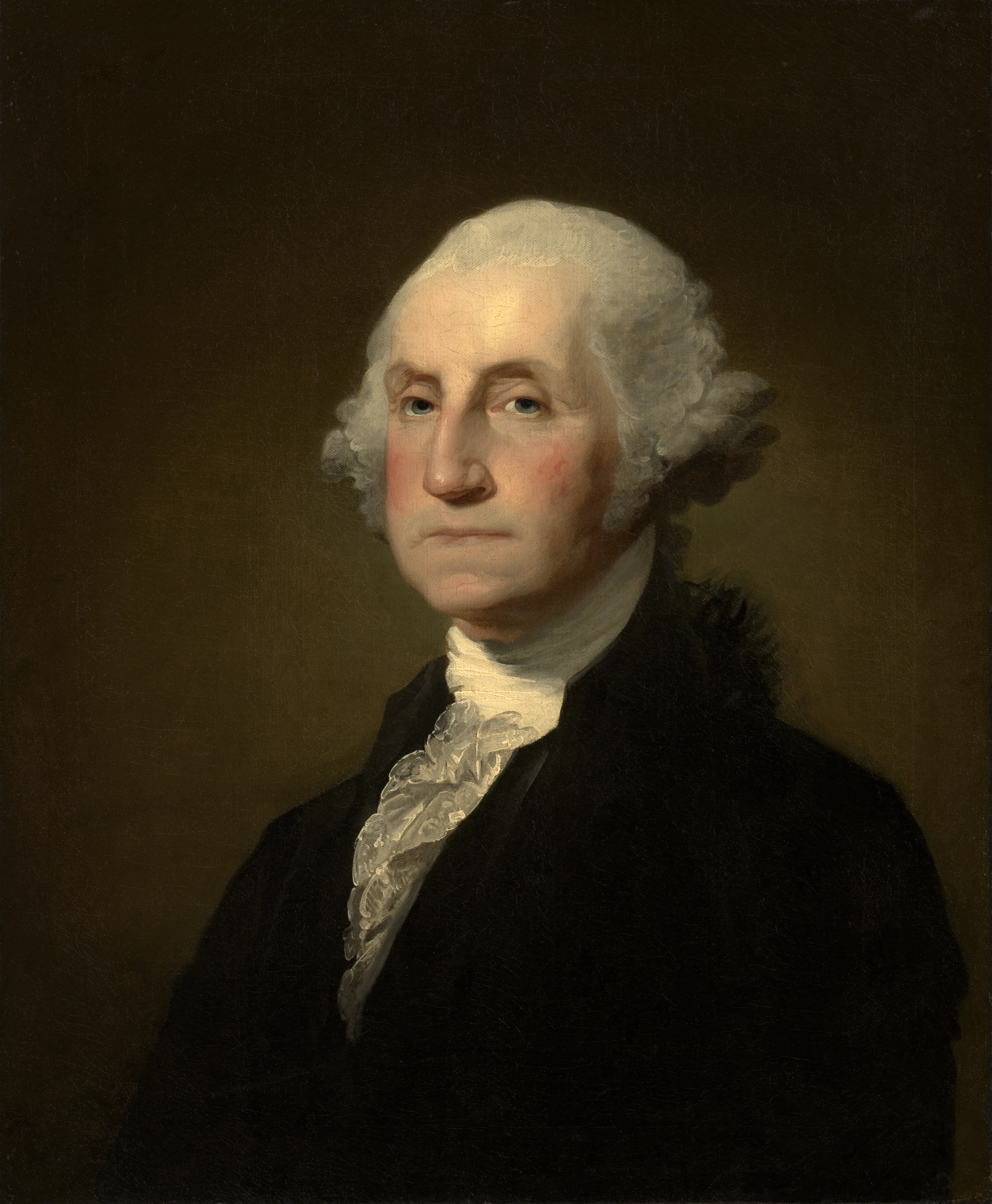
George Washington by Gilbert Stuart, c. 1805

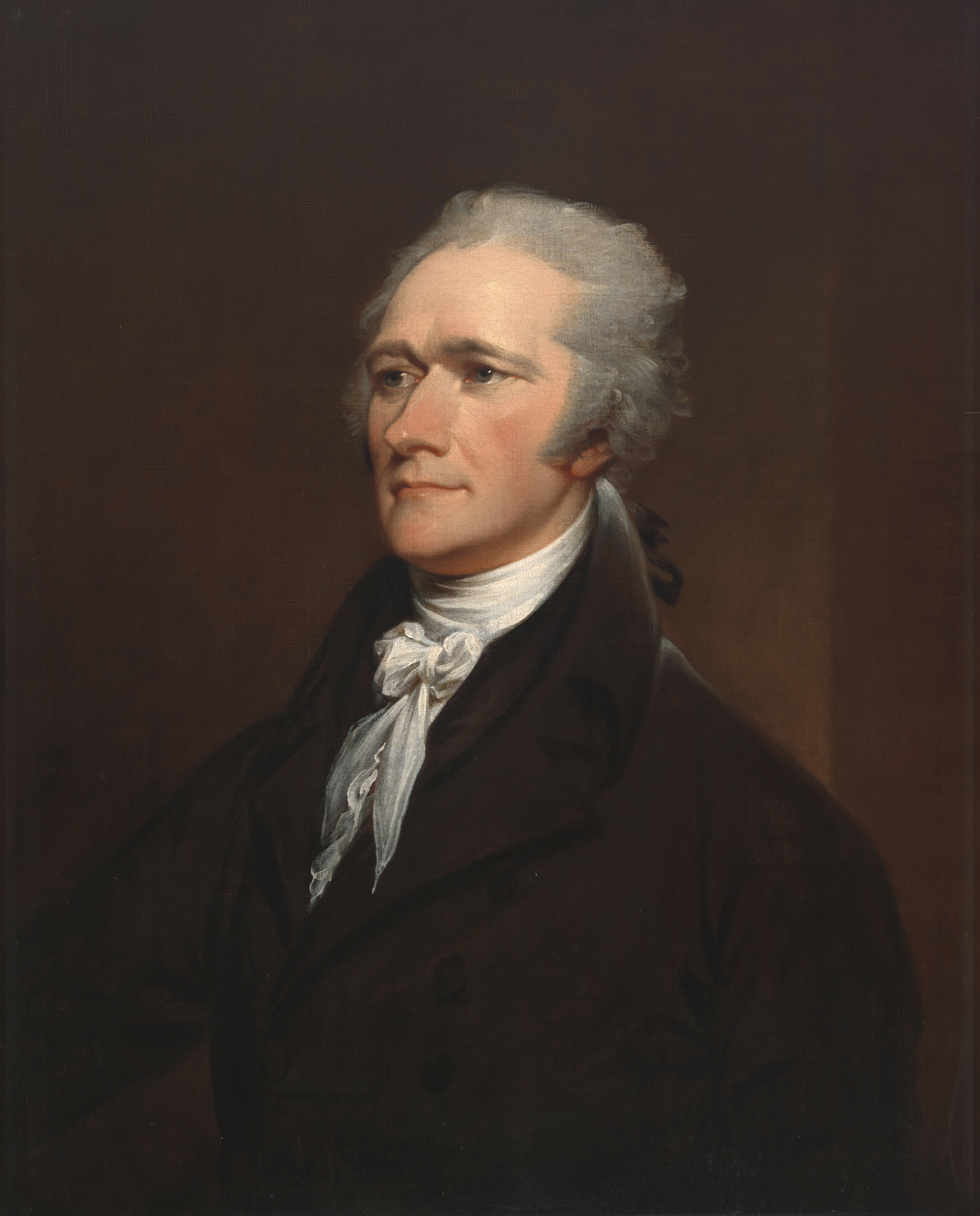
Alexander Hamilton by John Trumbull, c. 1806

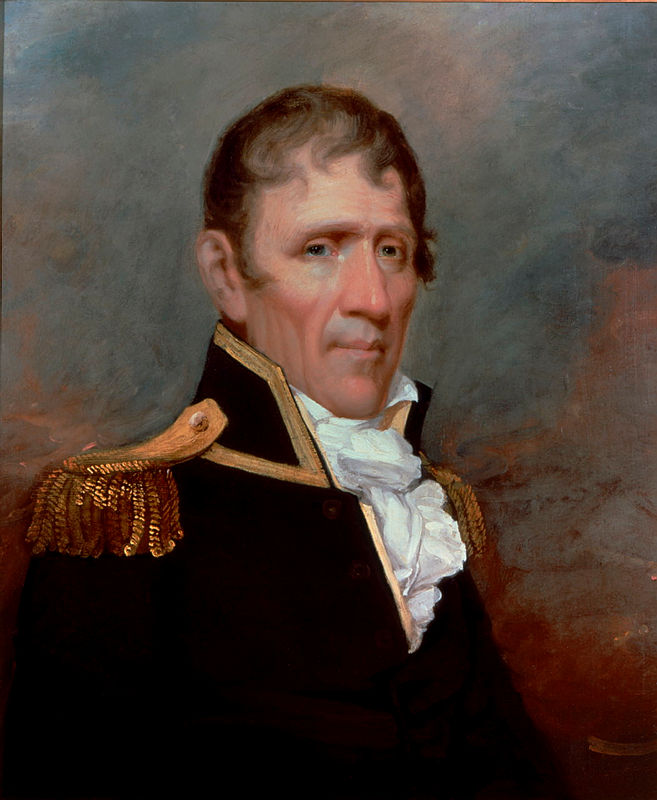
Andrew Jackson by John Wesley Jarvis, c. 1817

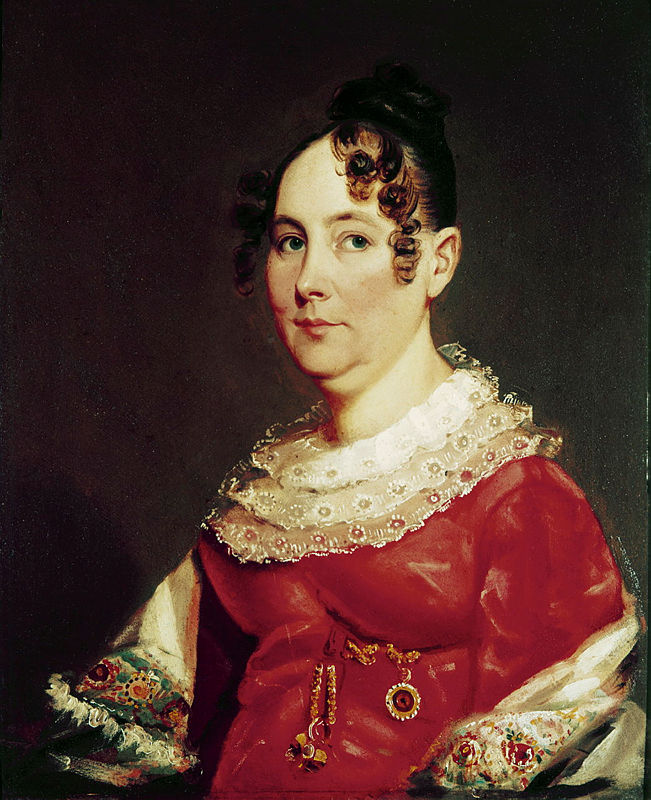
Lucy Payne Washington Todd by Matthew Harris Jouett, c. 1817-1820

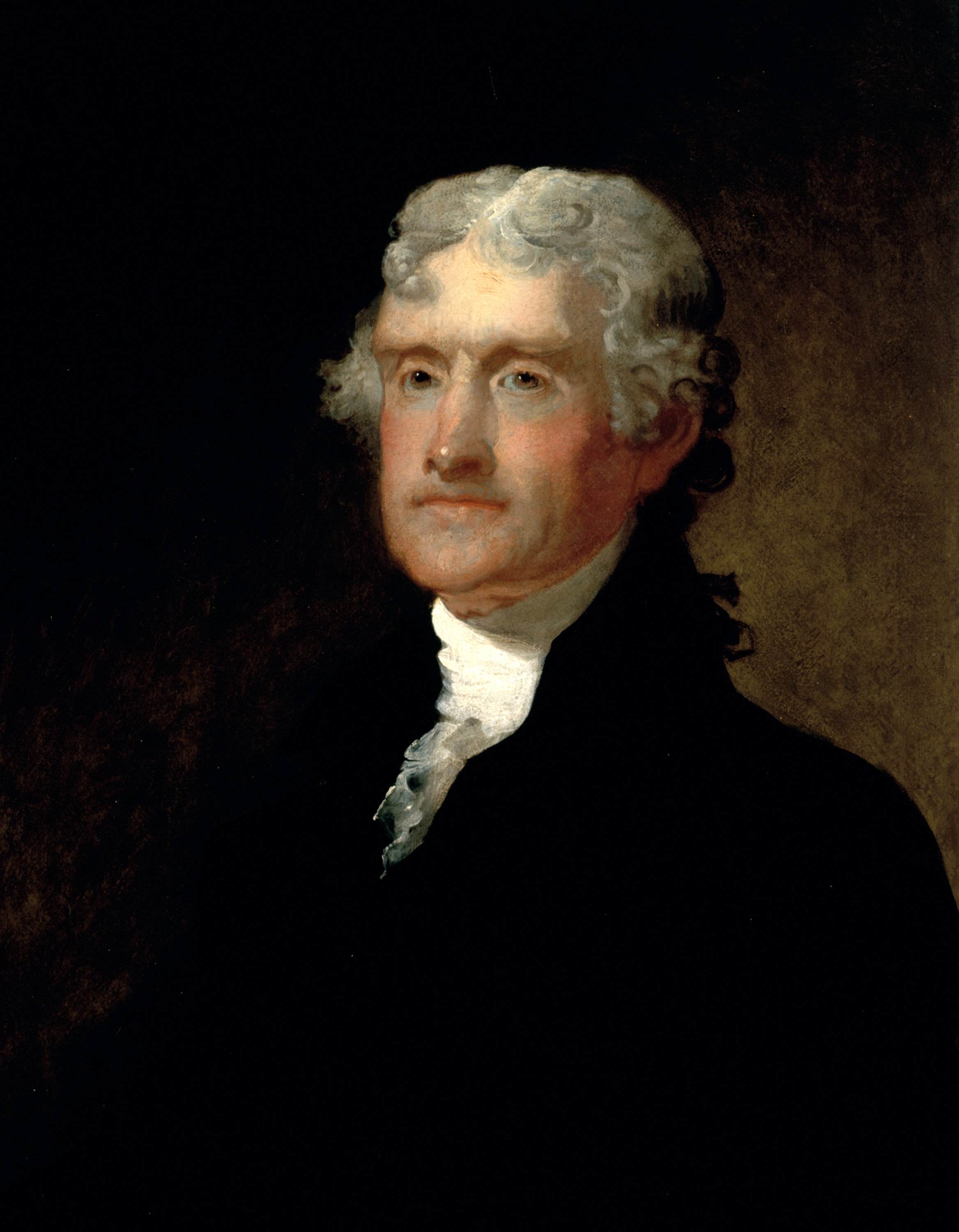
Thomas Jefferson by Matthew Harris Jouett, c. 1817-1827

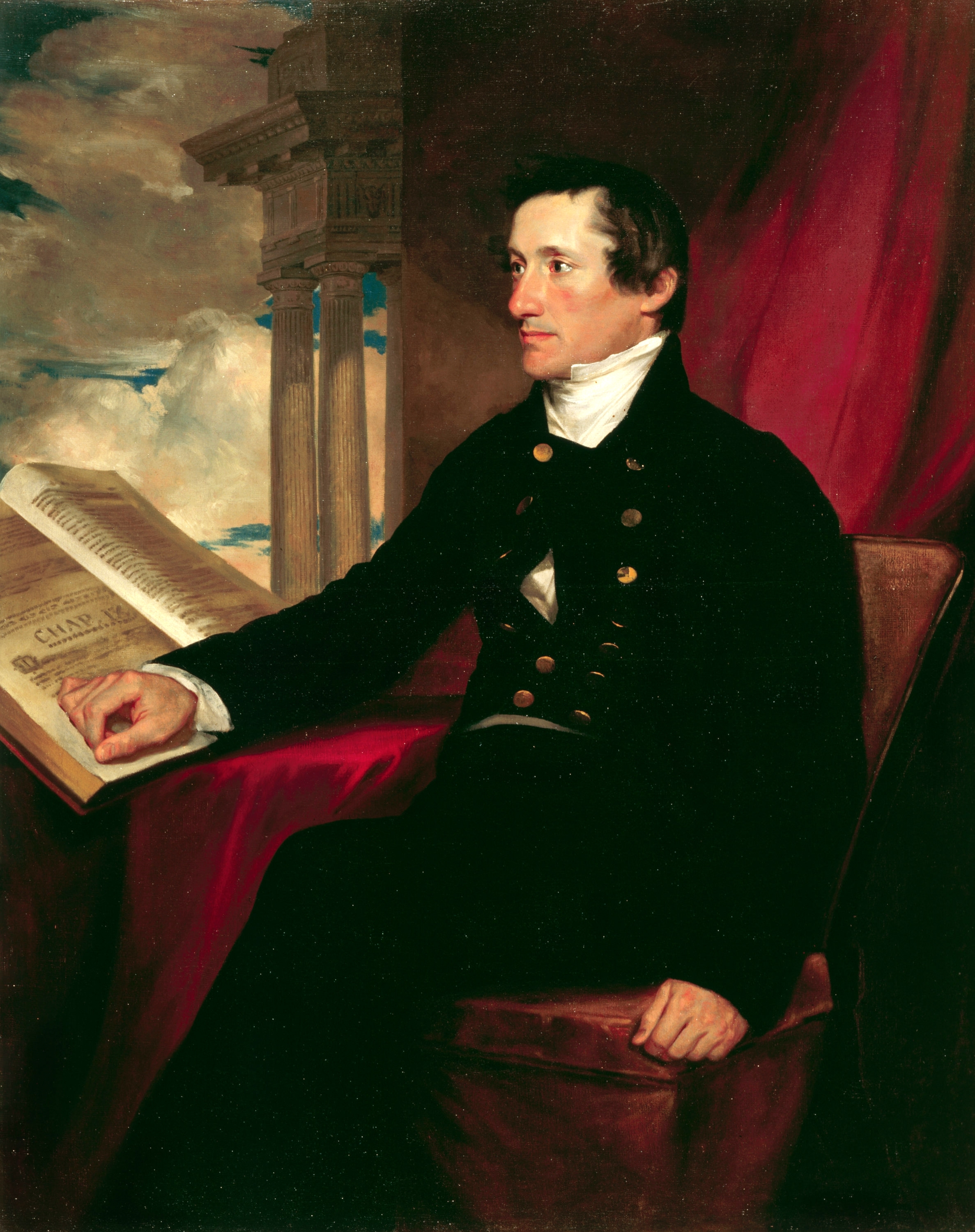
Colonel William Drayton by Samuel Finley Breese Morse, 1818

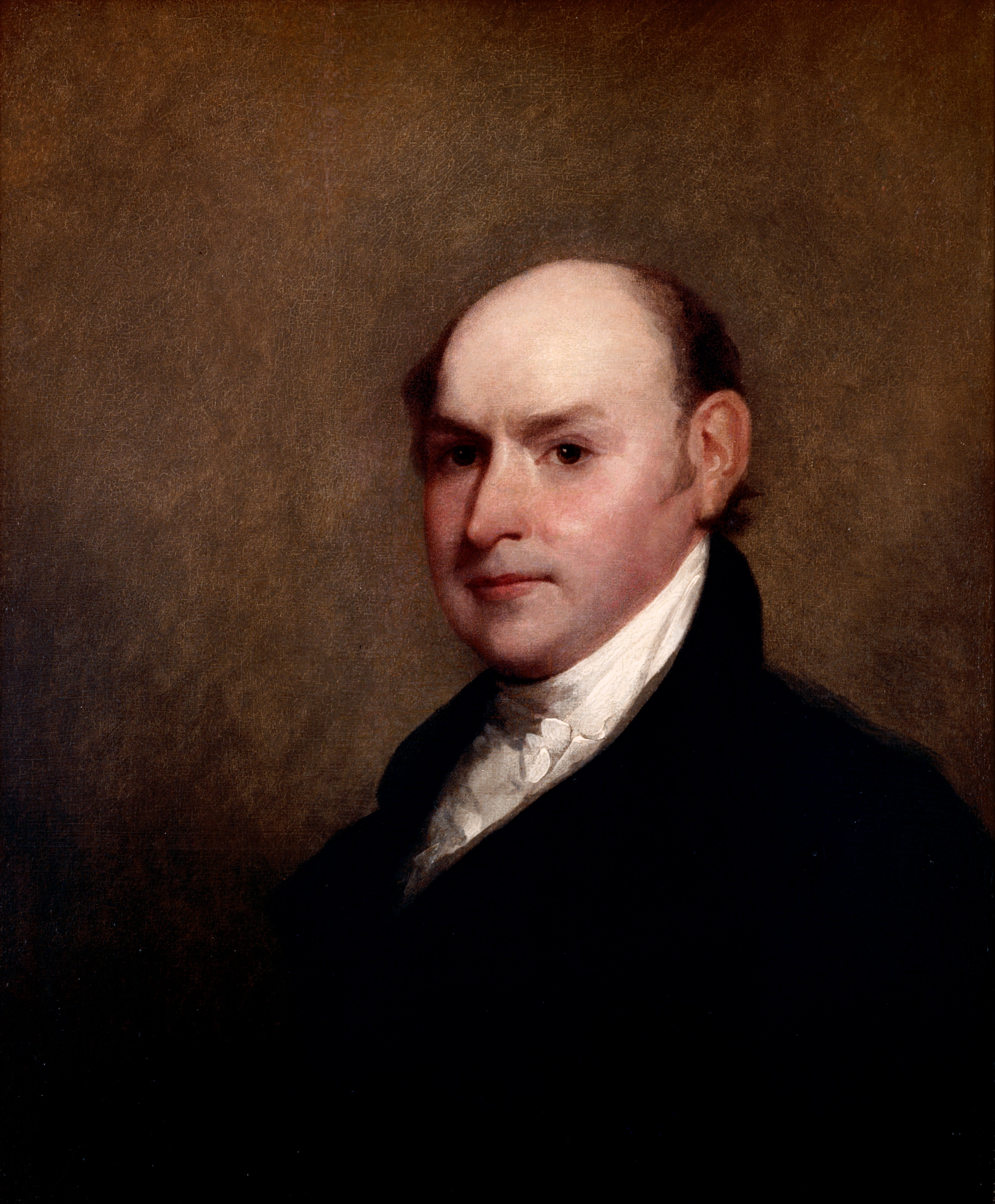
John Quincy Adams by Gilbert Stuart, 1818

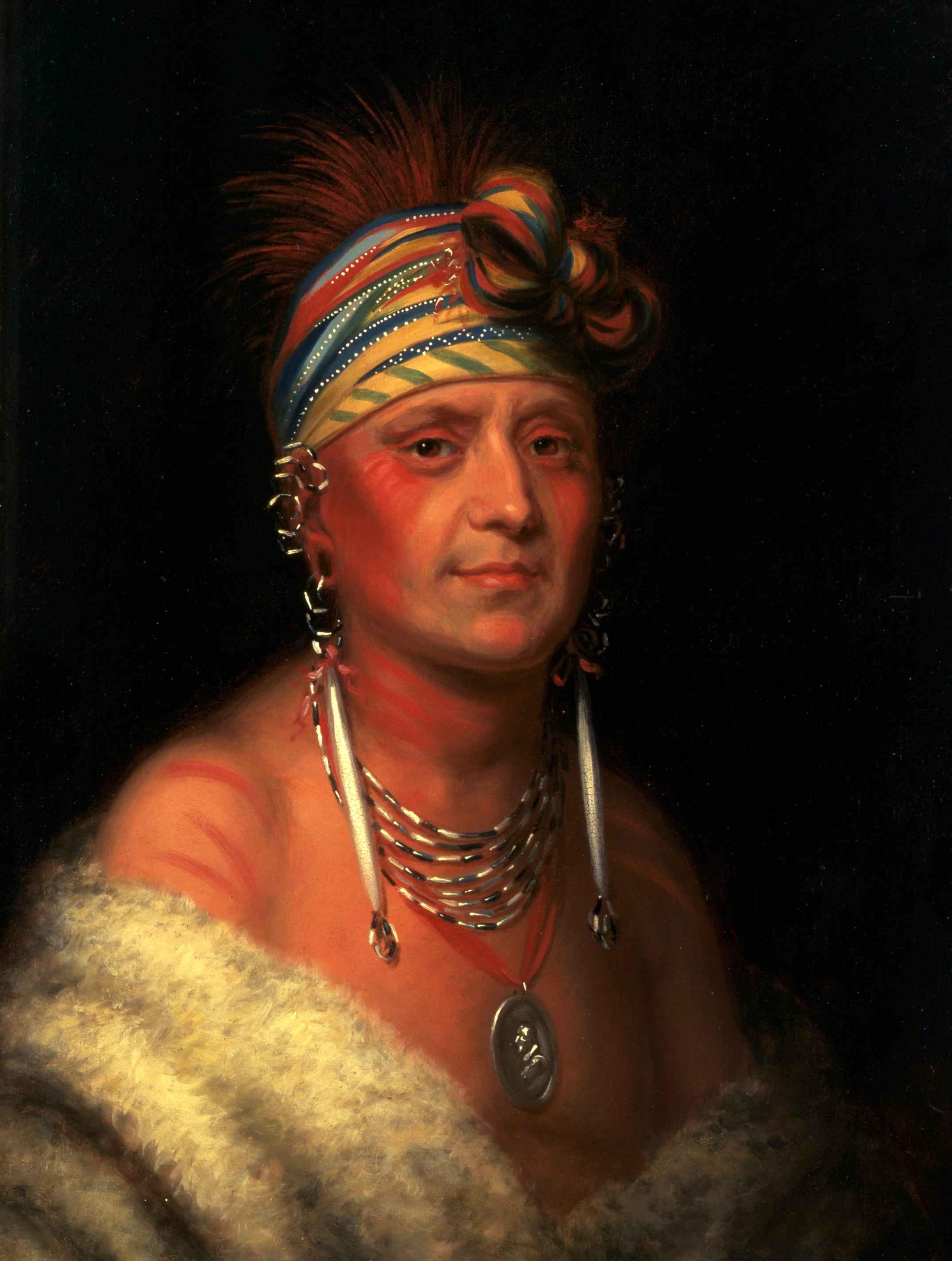
Monchousia (White Plume), Kansa by Charles Bird King, c. 1822

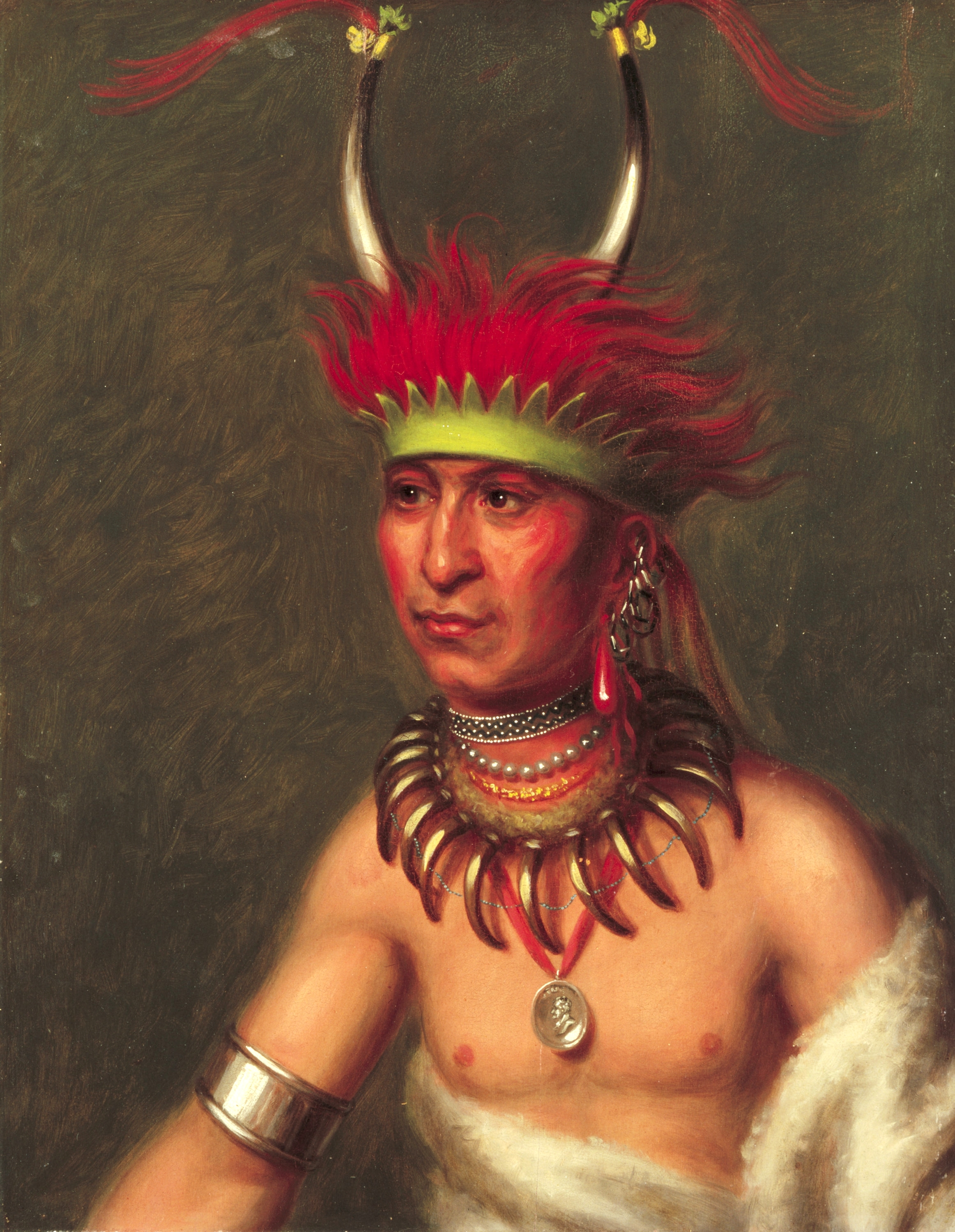
Shaumonekusse (Prairie Wolf), Oto by Charles Bird King, c. 1822

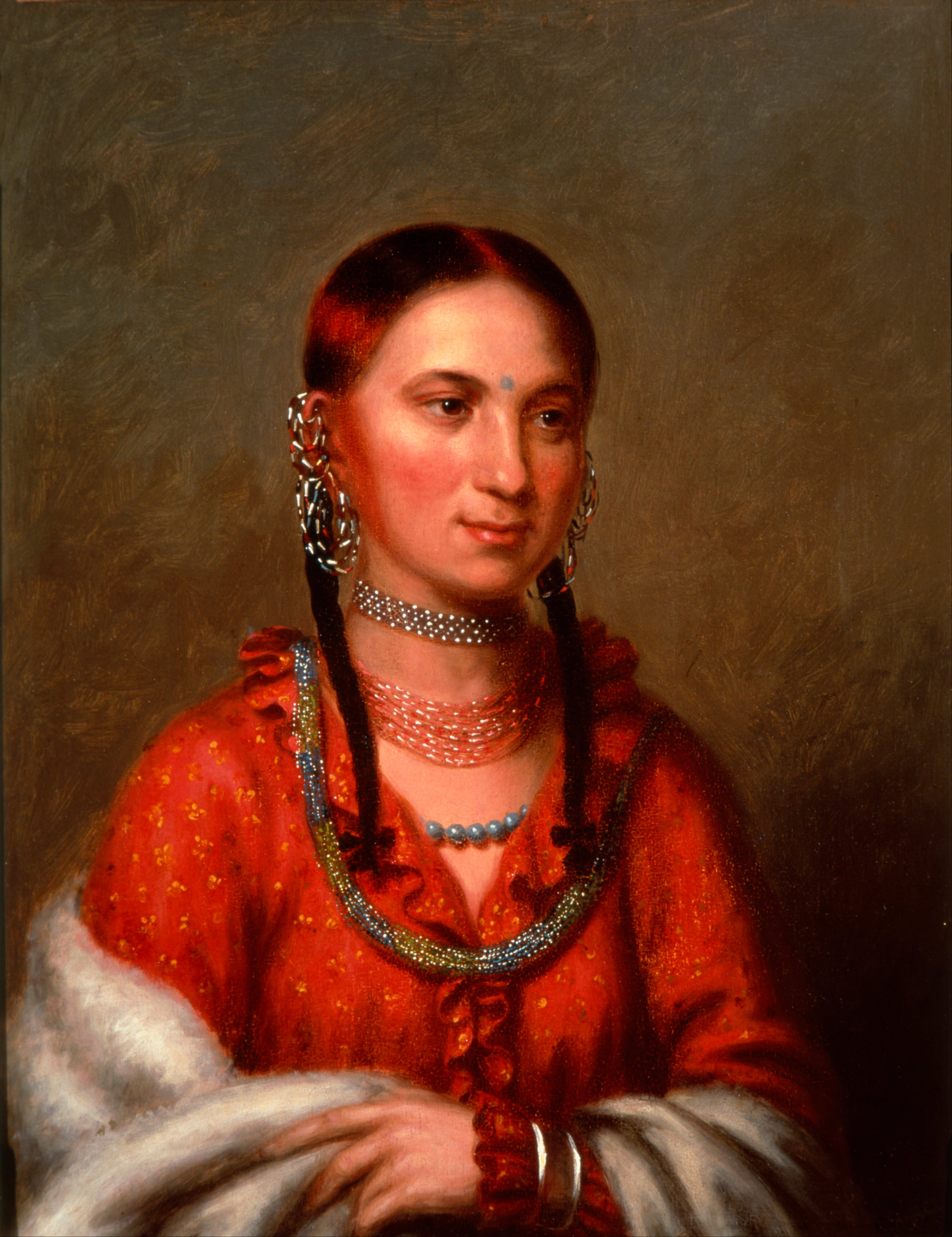
Hayne Hudjihini (Eagle of Delight), Oto by Charles Bird King, c. 1822

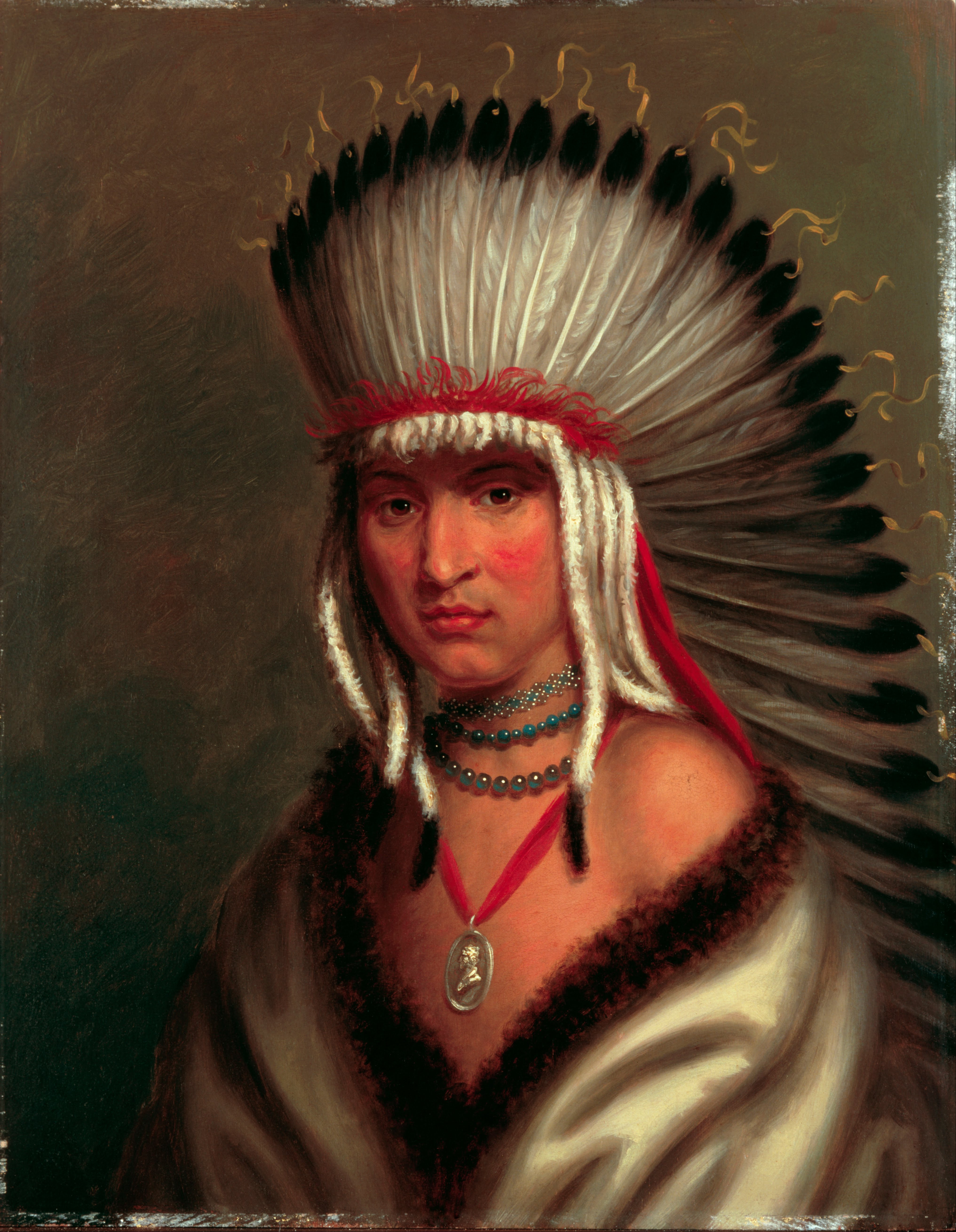
Petalesharro (Generous Chief), Pawnee by Charles Bird King, c. 1822

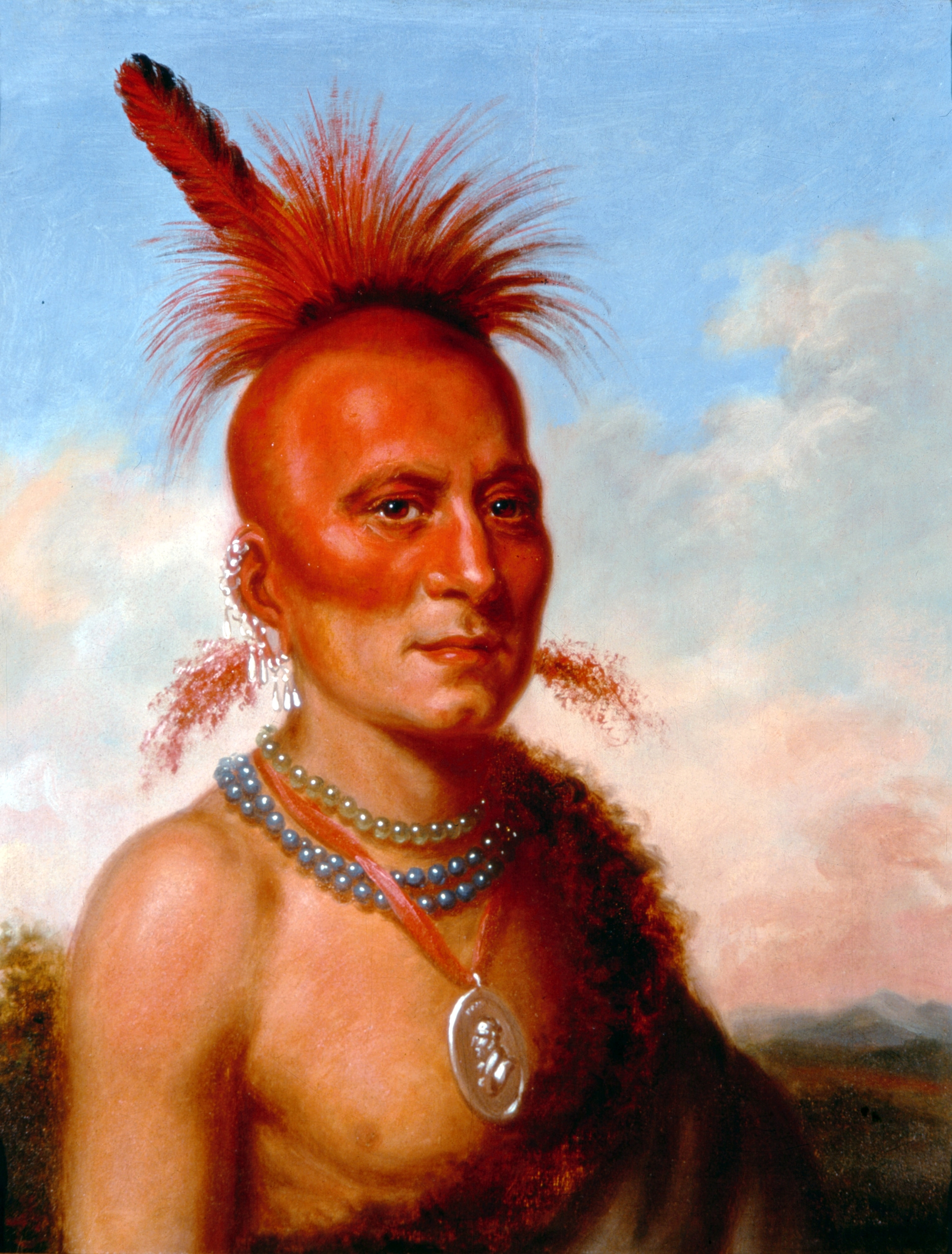
Sharitahrish (Wicked Chief), Pawnee by Charles Bird King, c. 1822

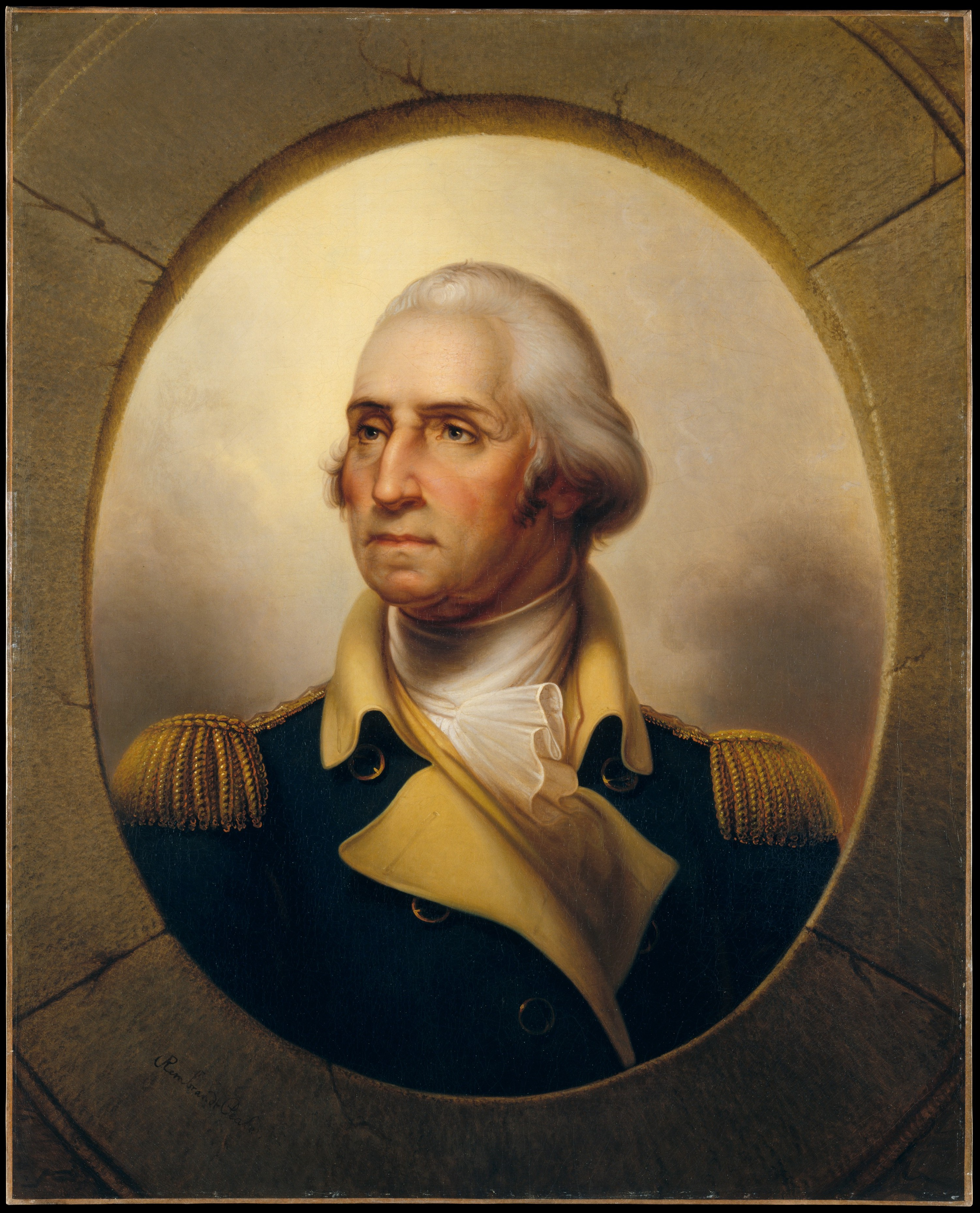
George Washington by Rembrandt Peale, c. 1823

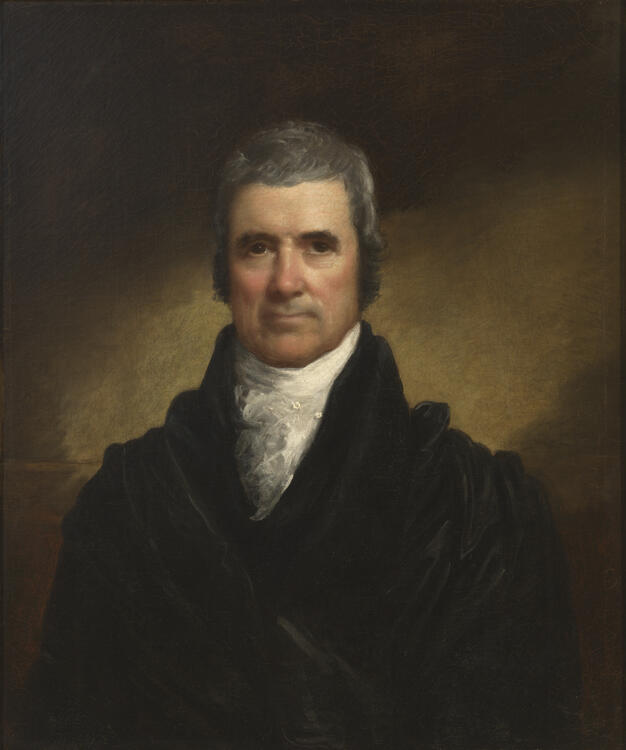
John Marshall by John Wesley Jarvis, 1825

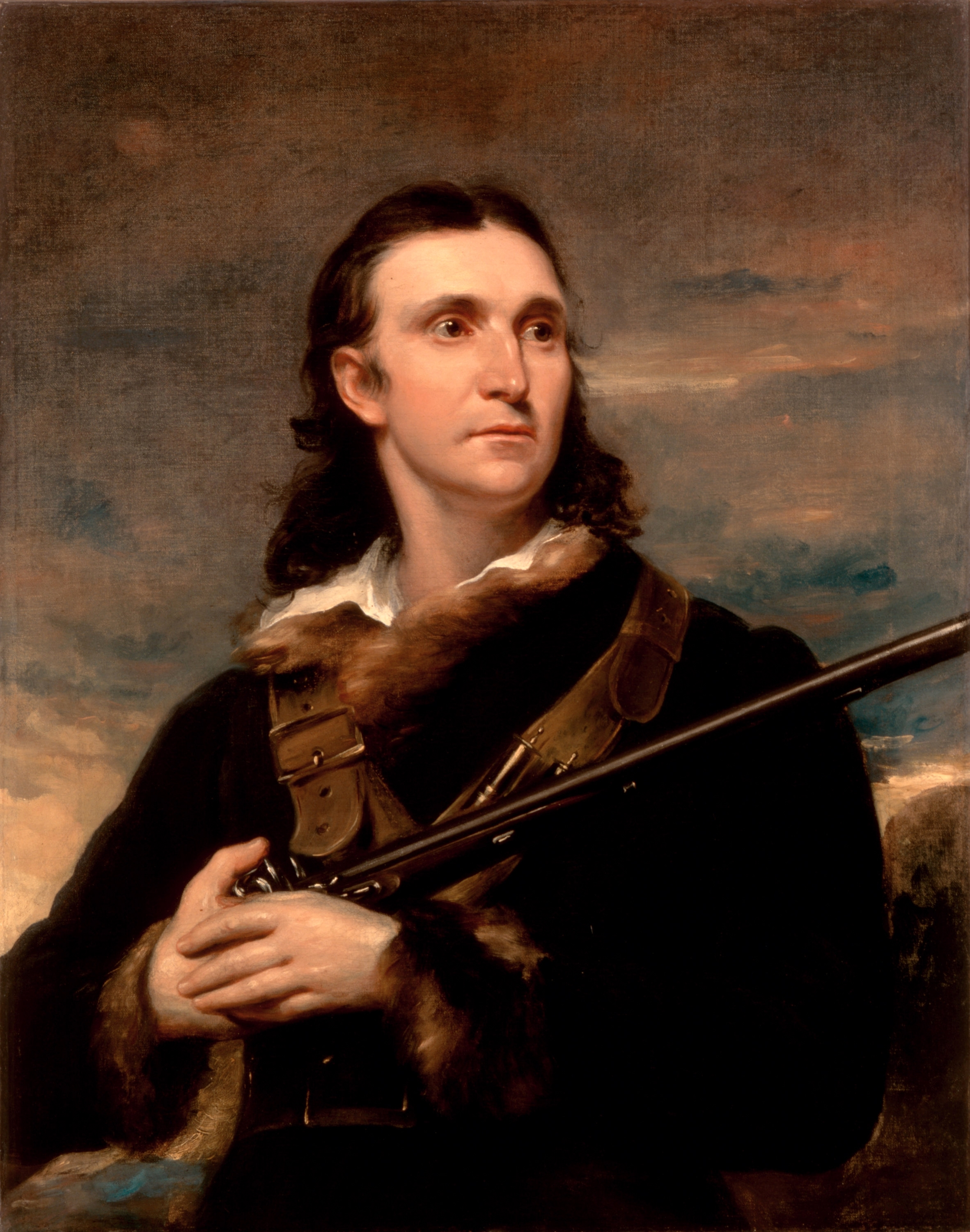
John James Audubon by John Syme, 1826

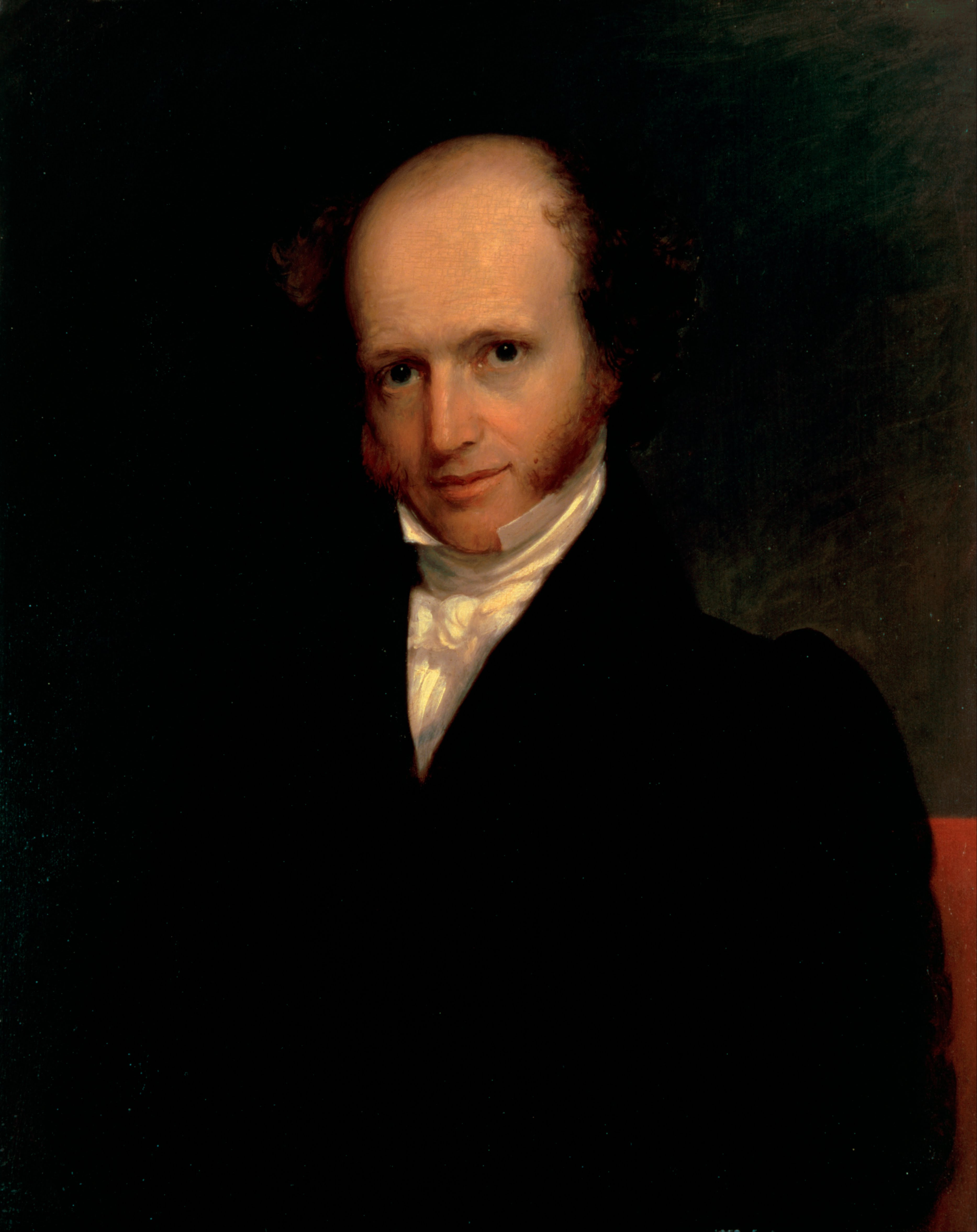
Martin Van Buren by Francis Alexander, c. 1830-1840

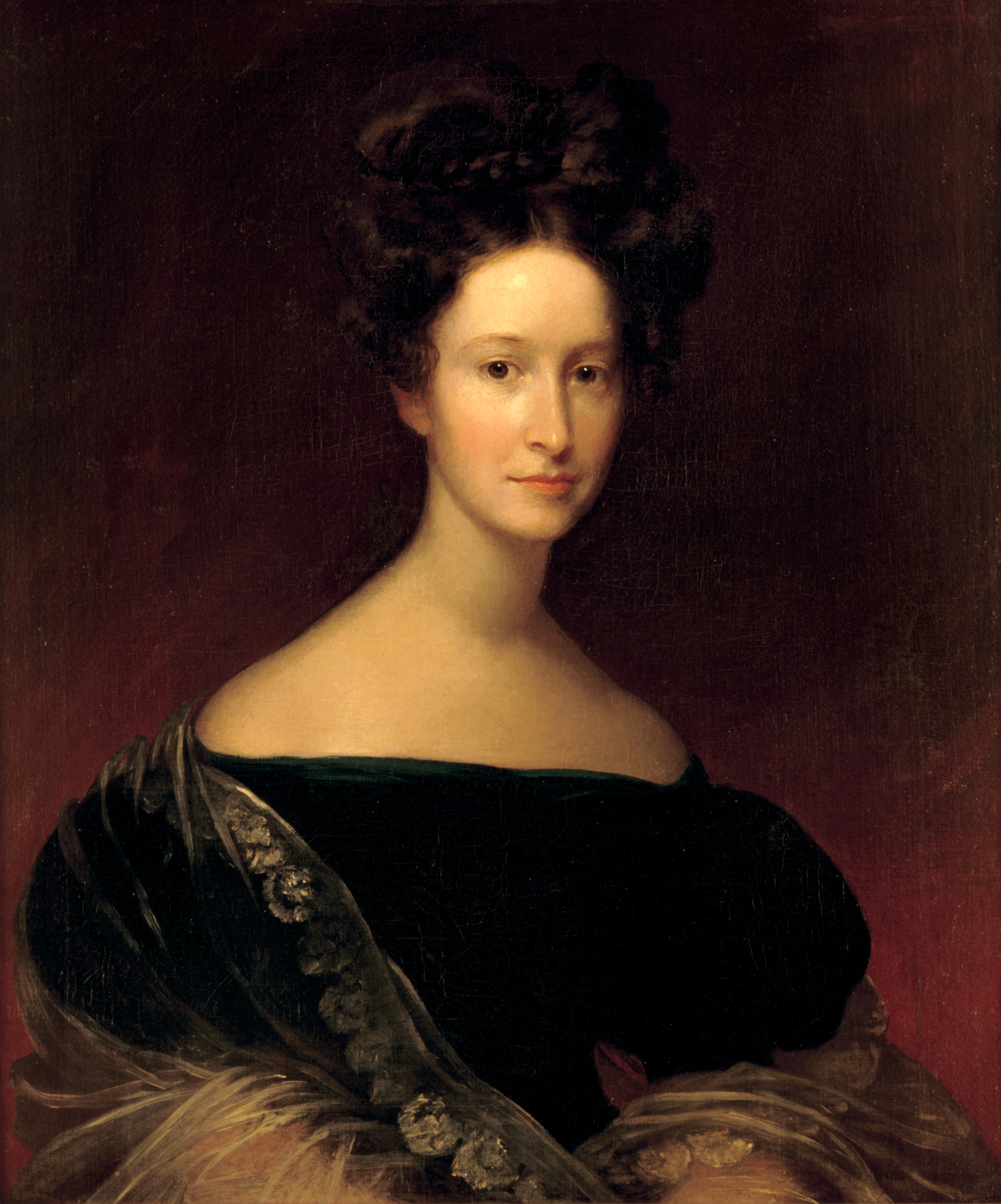
Emily Donelson by Ralph Eleaser Whiteside Earl, 1830

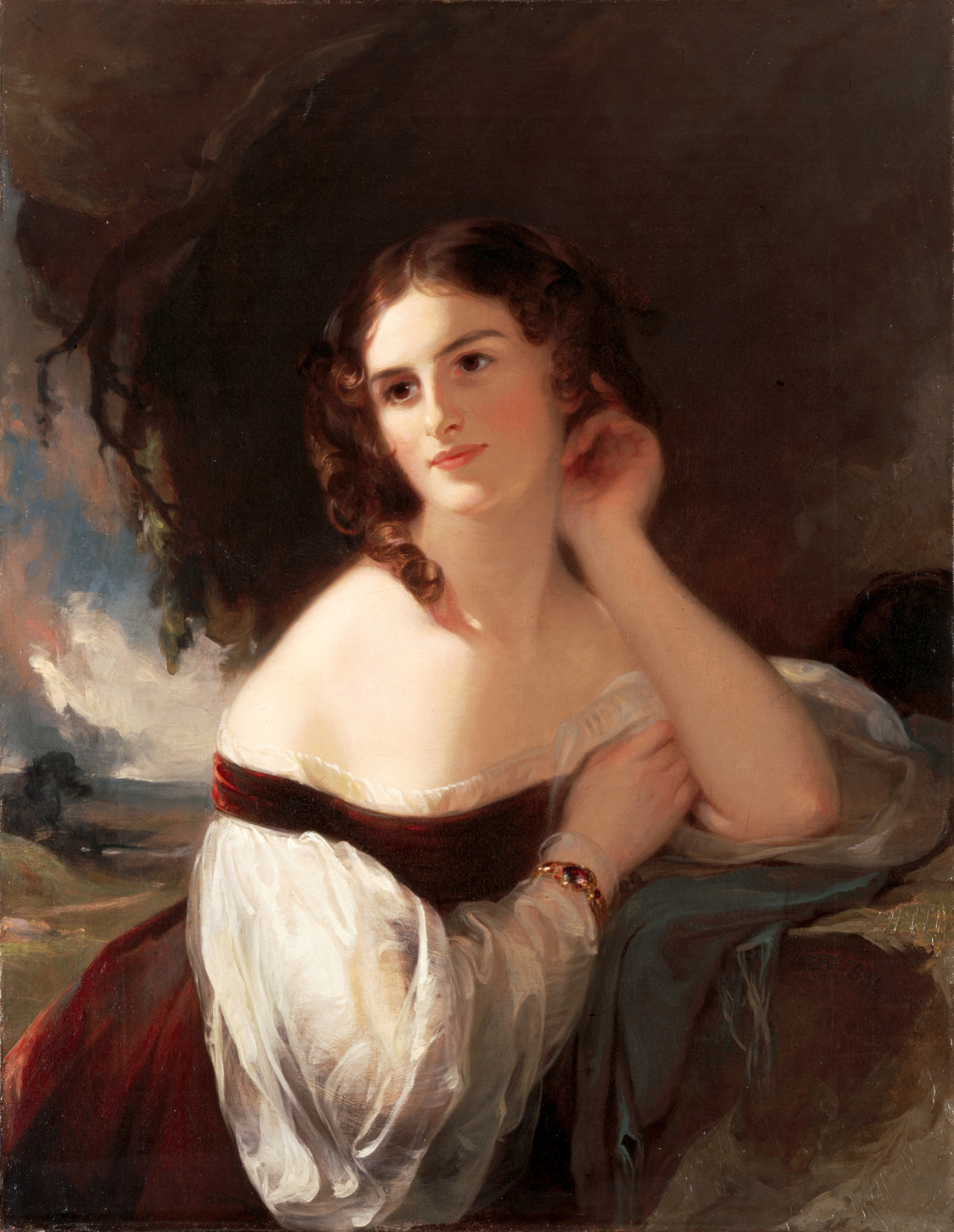
Fanny Kemble by Thomas Sully, 1834

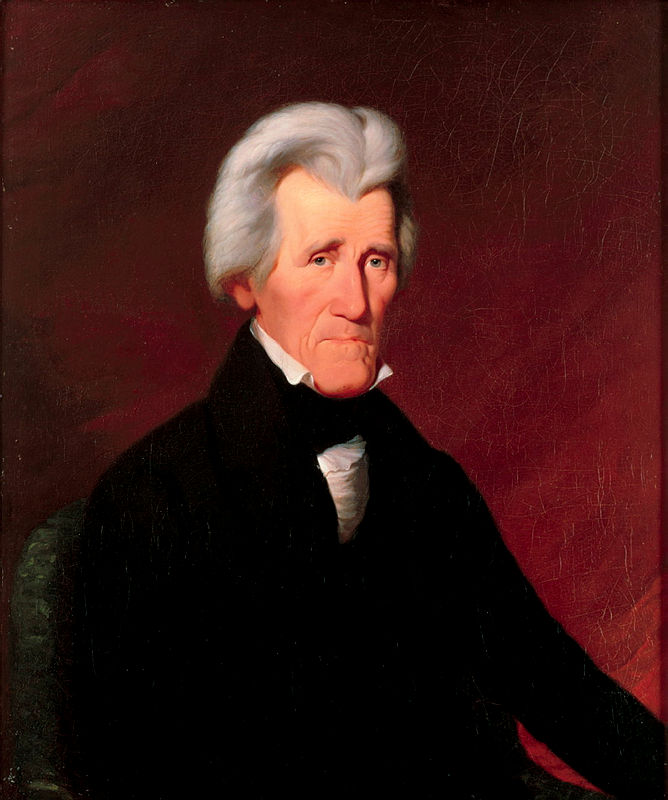
Andrew Jackson by Miner Kilbourne Kellogg, c. 1840

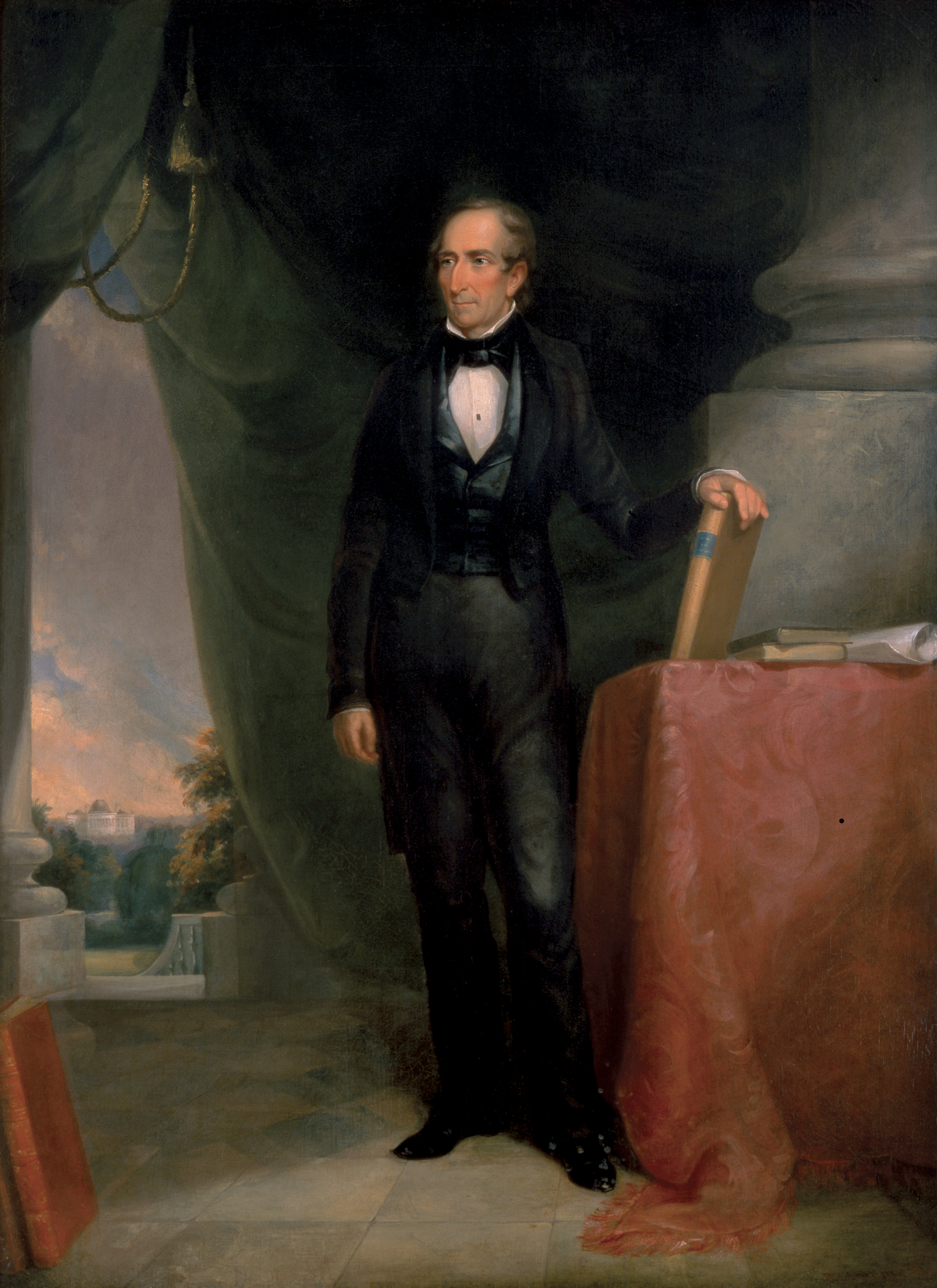
John Tyler by James Reid Lambdin, 1841

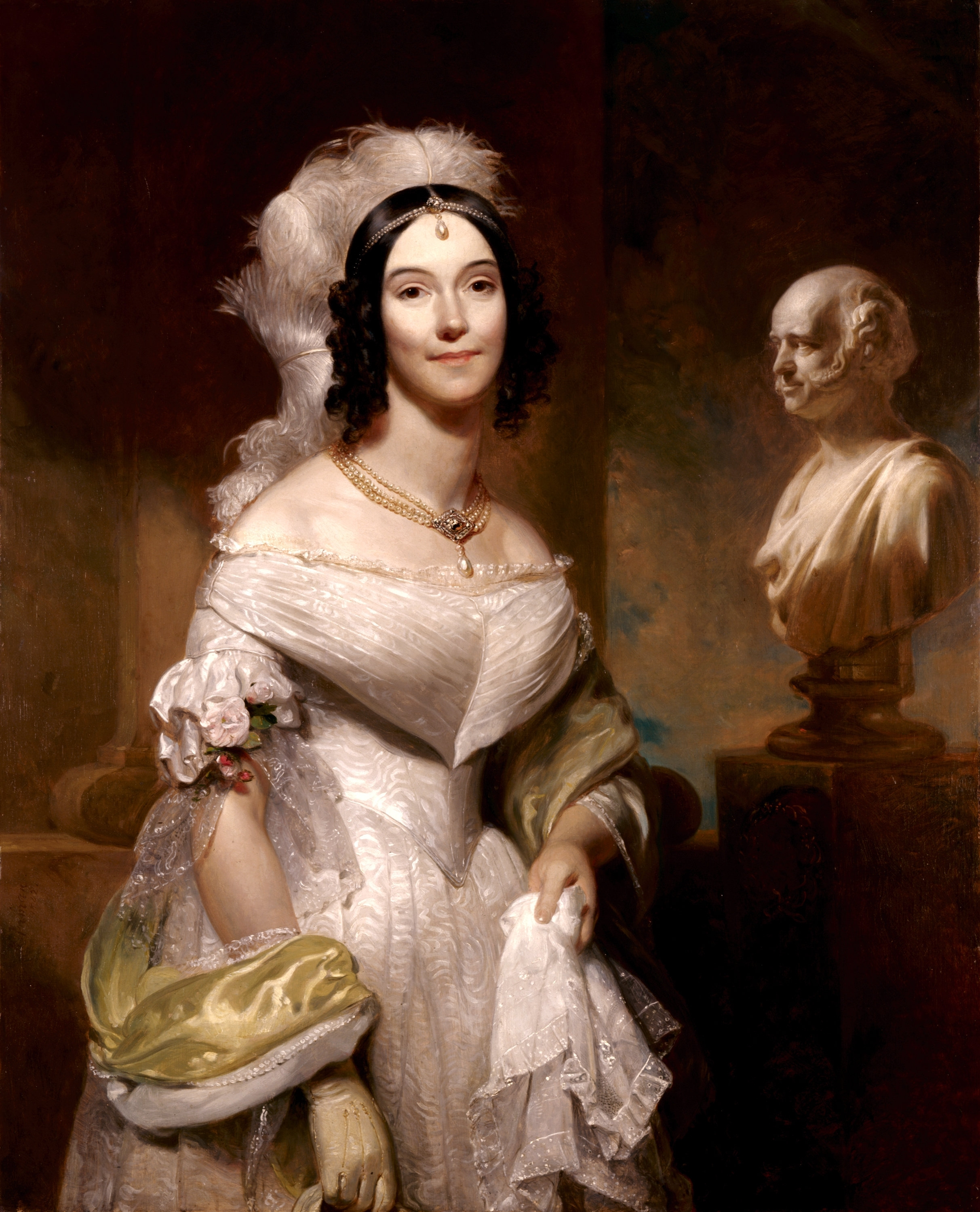
Portrait of Angelica Singleton Van Buren by Henry Inman, 1842

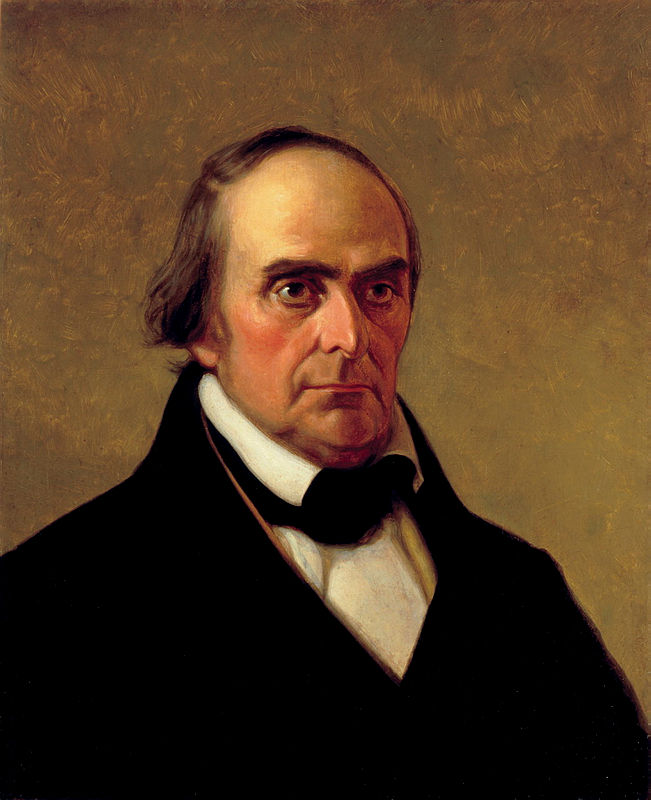
Daniel Webster by George Peter Alexander Healy, mid 19th-century

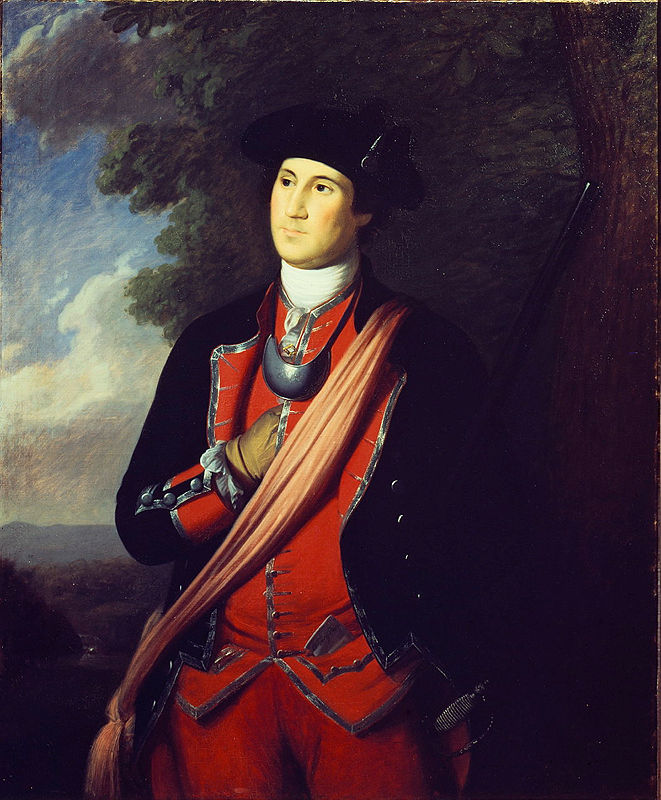
George Washington by Ernst Fischer, c. 1850-1852

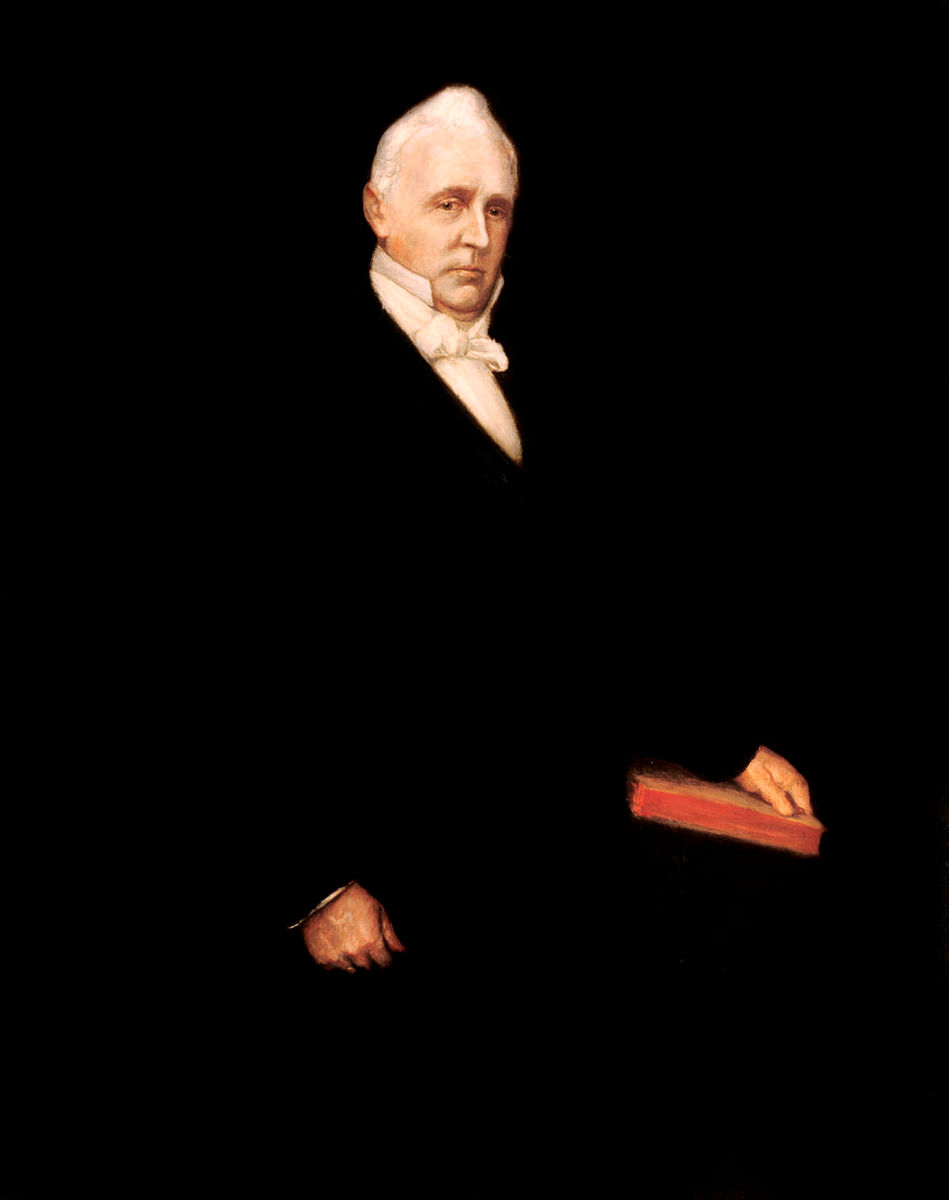
James Buchanan by John Henry Brown, 1851

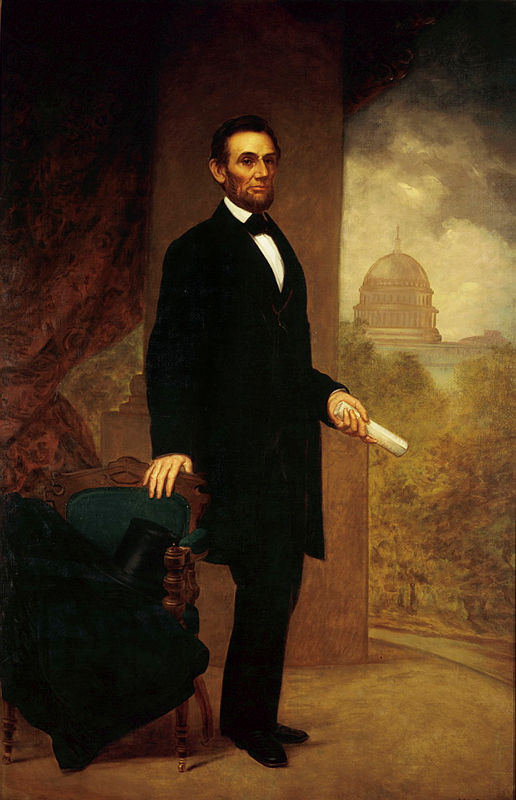
Abraham Lincoln by William F. Cogswell, 1869

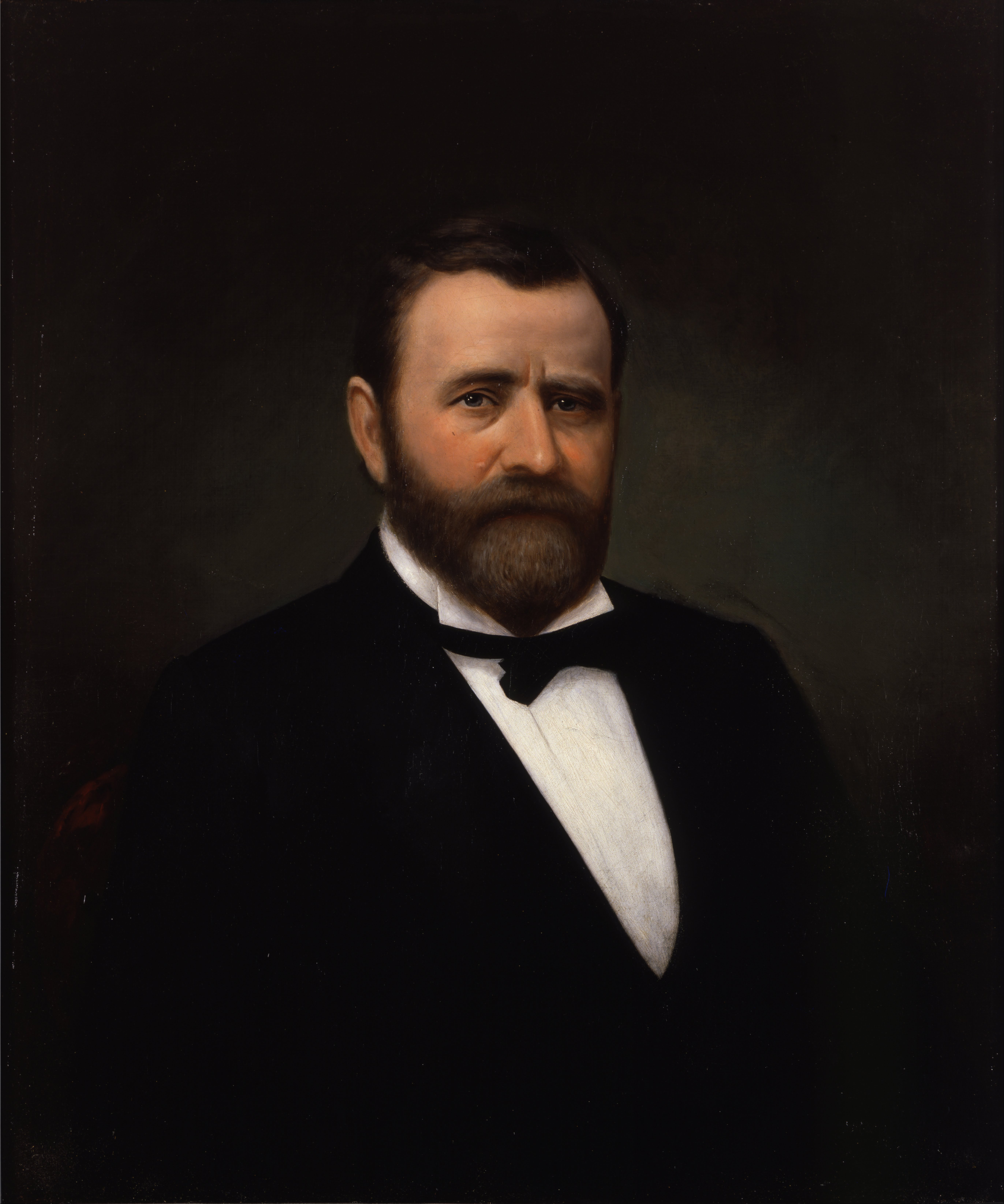
Ulysses S. Grant by Unknown, late 19th-century

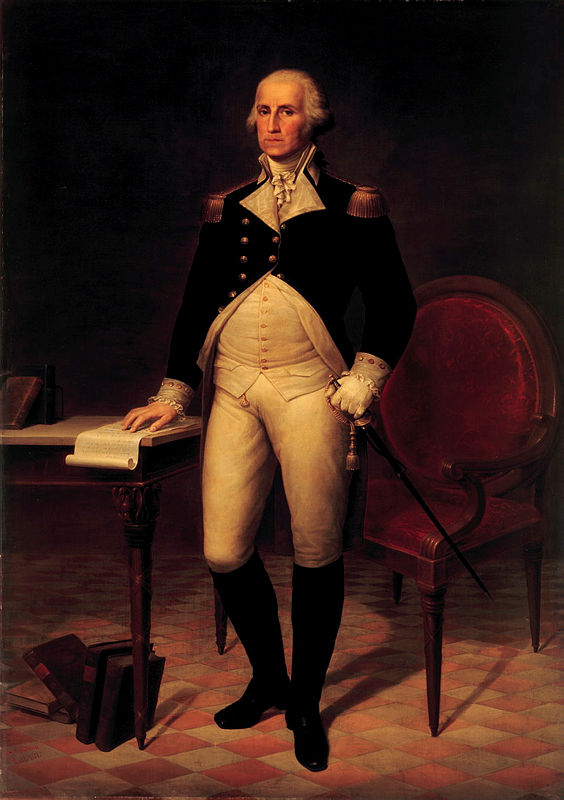
George Washington by Luis Cadena, 1877

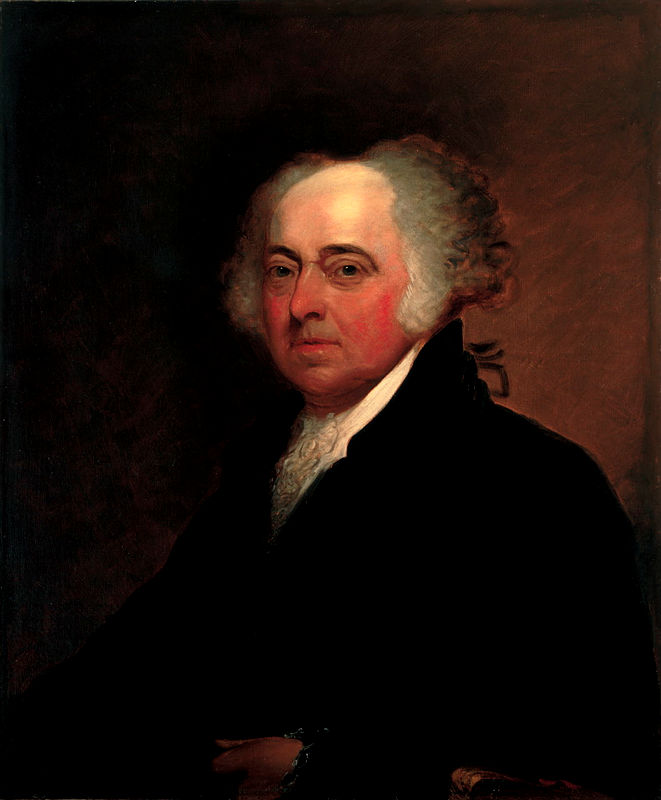
John Adams by Edgar Parker, 1878

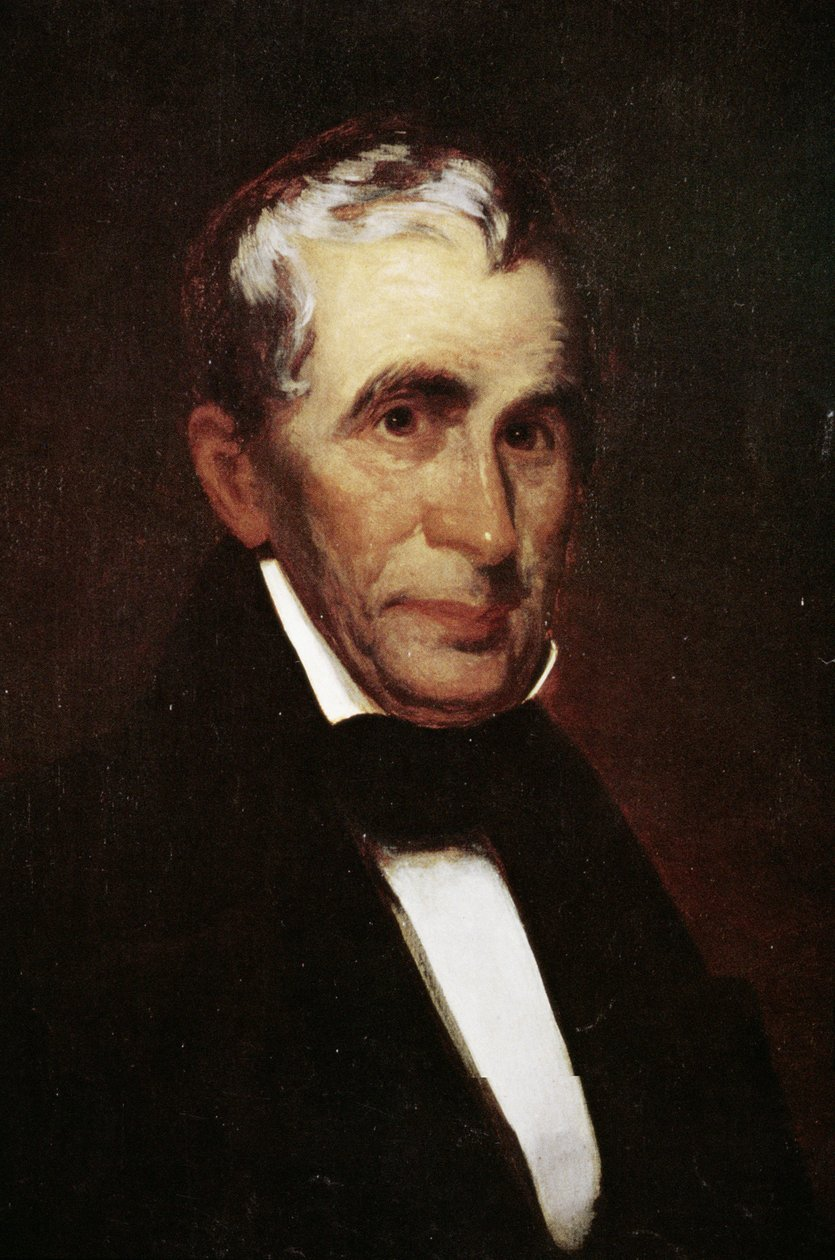
William Henry Harrison by Eliphalet Frazer Andrews, 1879

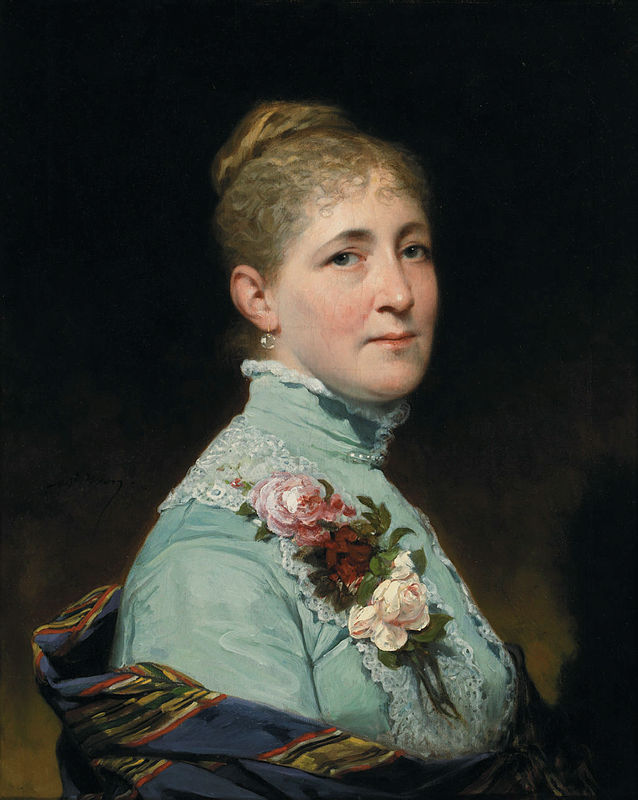
Caroline Lavinia Scott Harrison by Adolphe Yvon, c. 1880

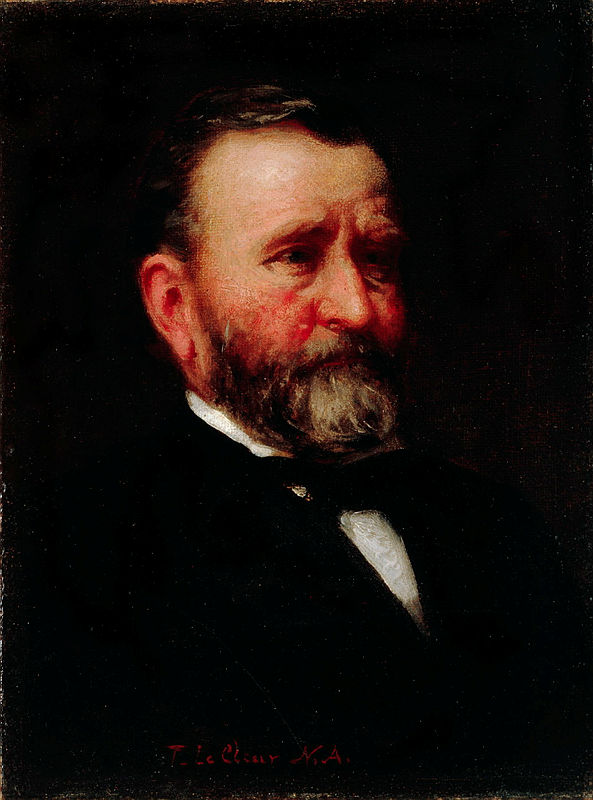
Ulysses S. Grant by Thomas Le Clear, c. 1881

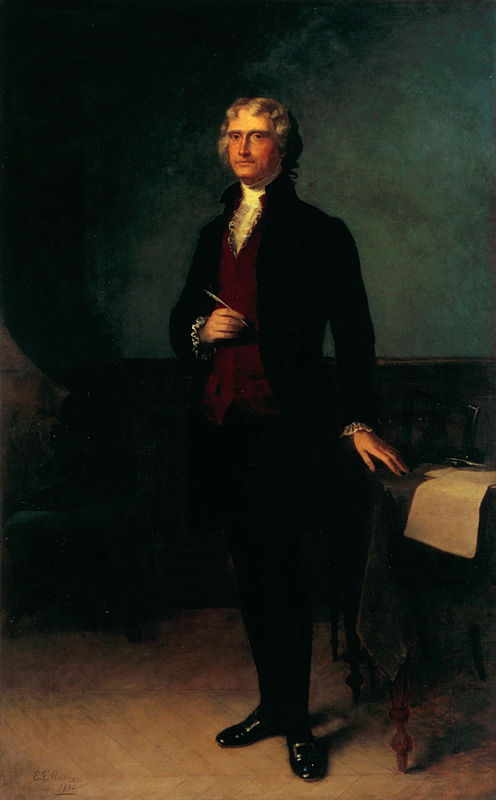
Thomas Jefferson by Eliphalet Frazer Andrews, 1884

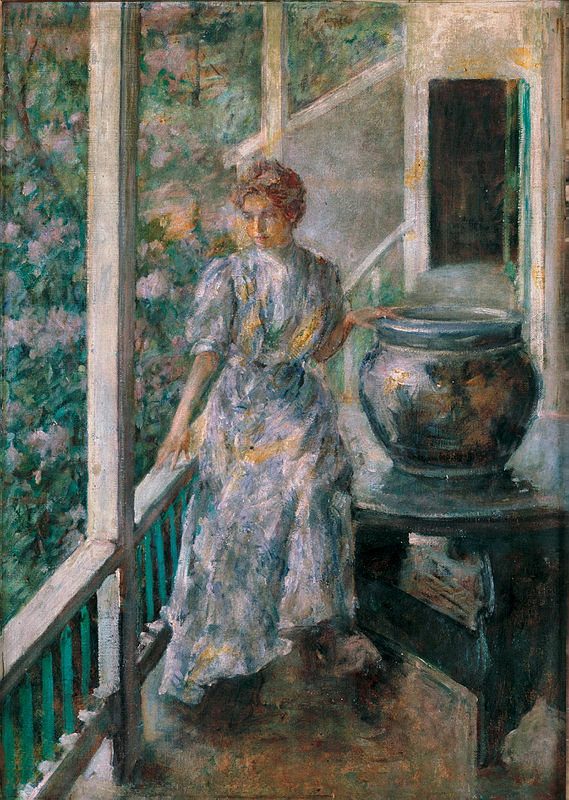
The Blue Vase by Robert Lewis Reid, c. 1890-1910

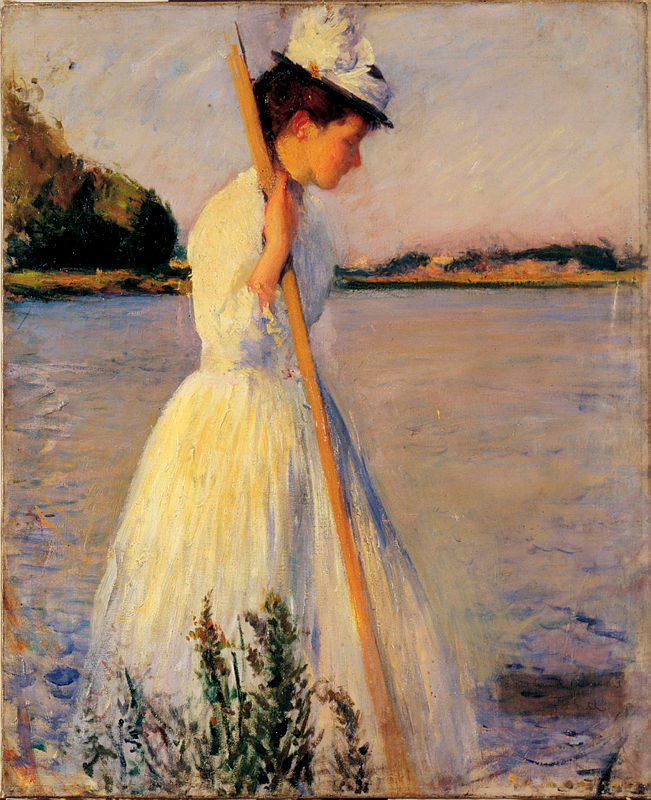
Woman Standing With an Oar by Edmund Charles Tarbell, 1891

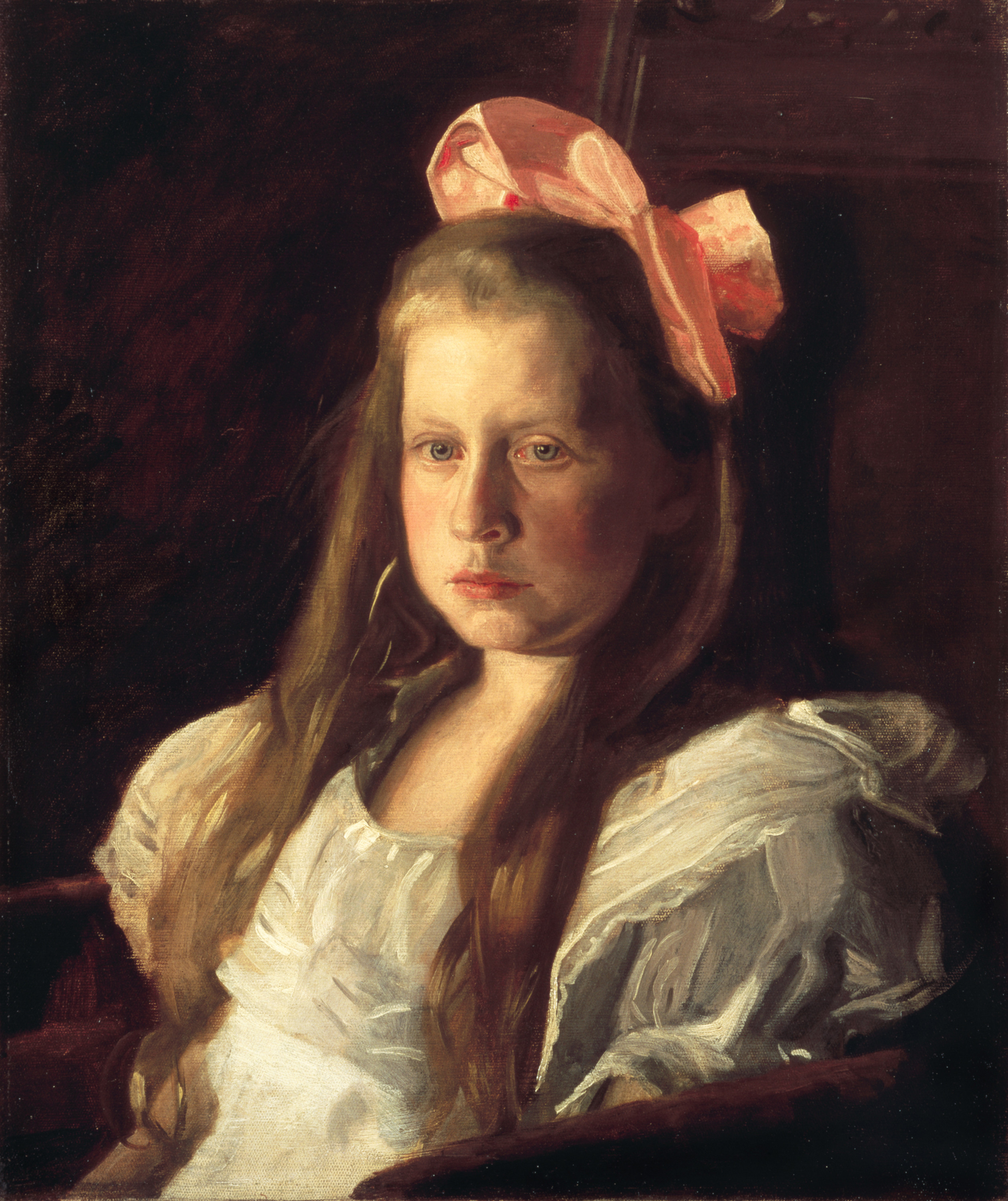
Ruth (Portrait of Ruth Harding) by Thomas Eakins, 1903

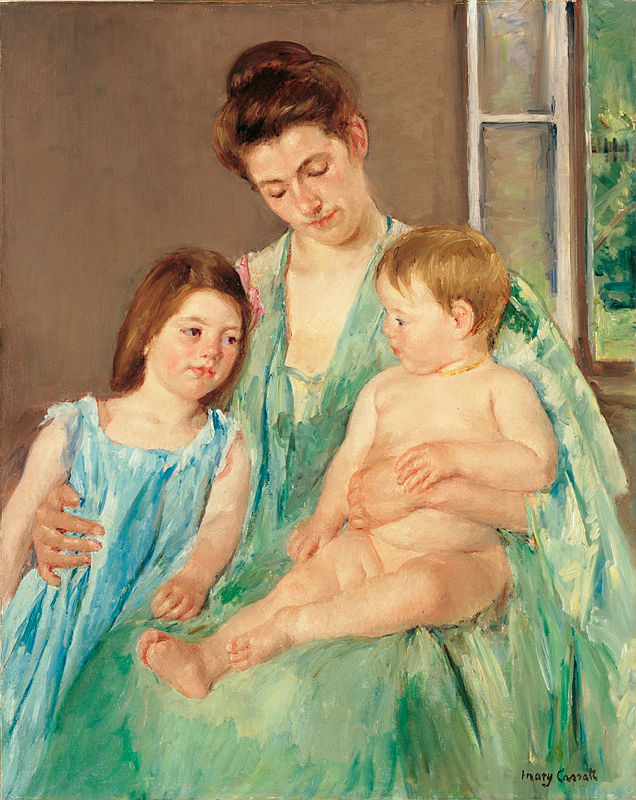
Young Mother and Two Children by Mary Cassatt, 1908

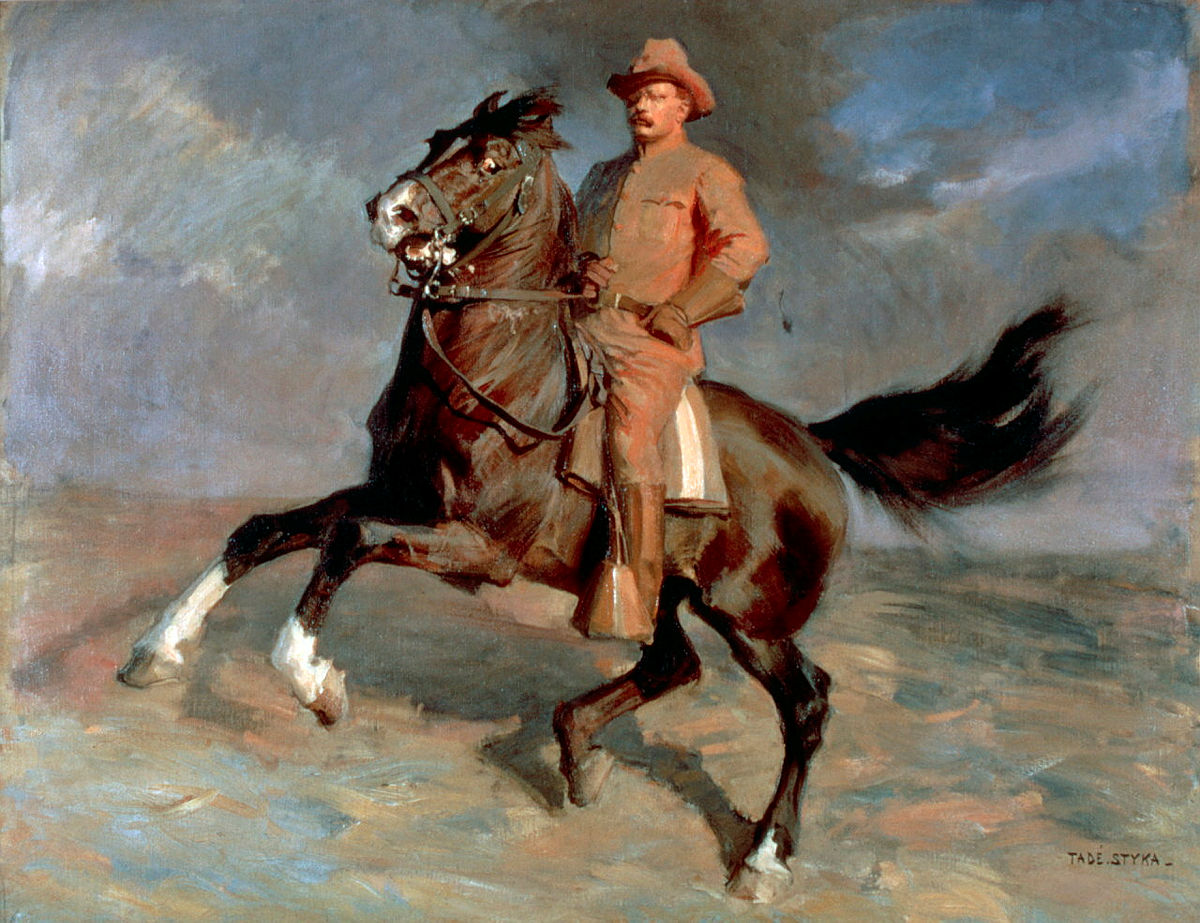
Rough Rider by Tadeusz Styka, c. 1909

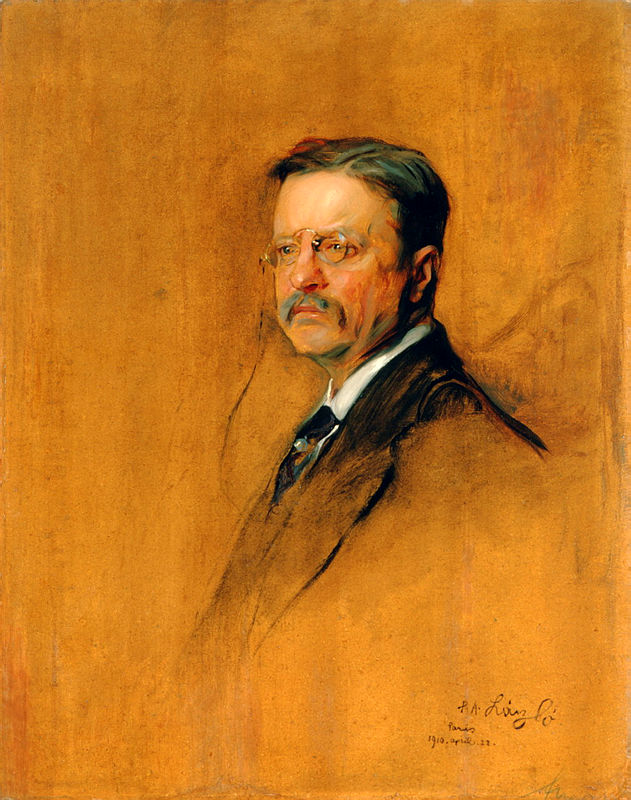
Theodore Roosevelt by Fülöp László, 1910

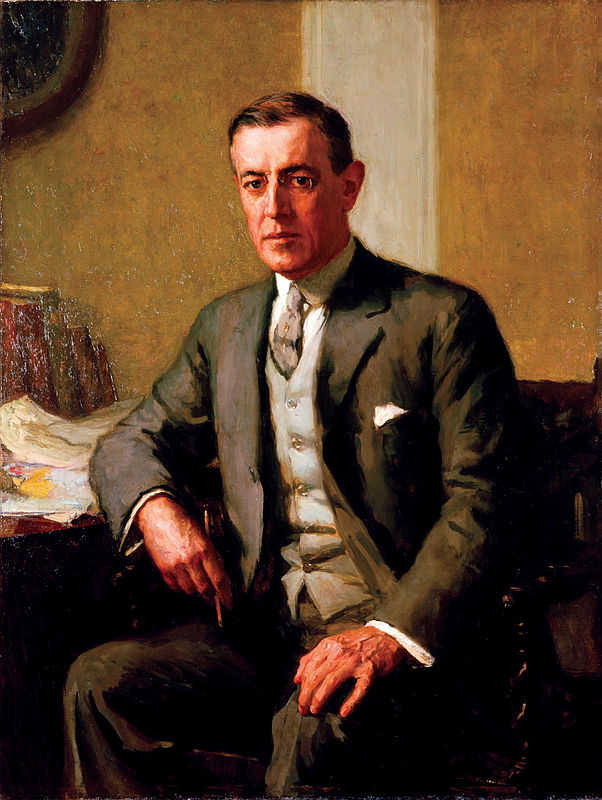
Woodrow Wilson by Stephen Seymour Thomas, 1913

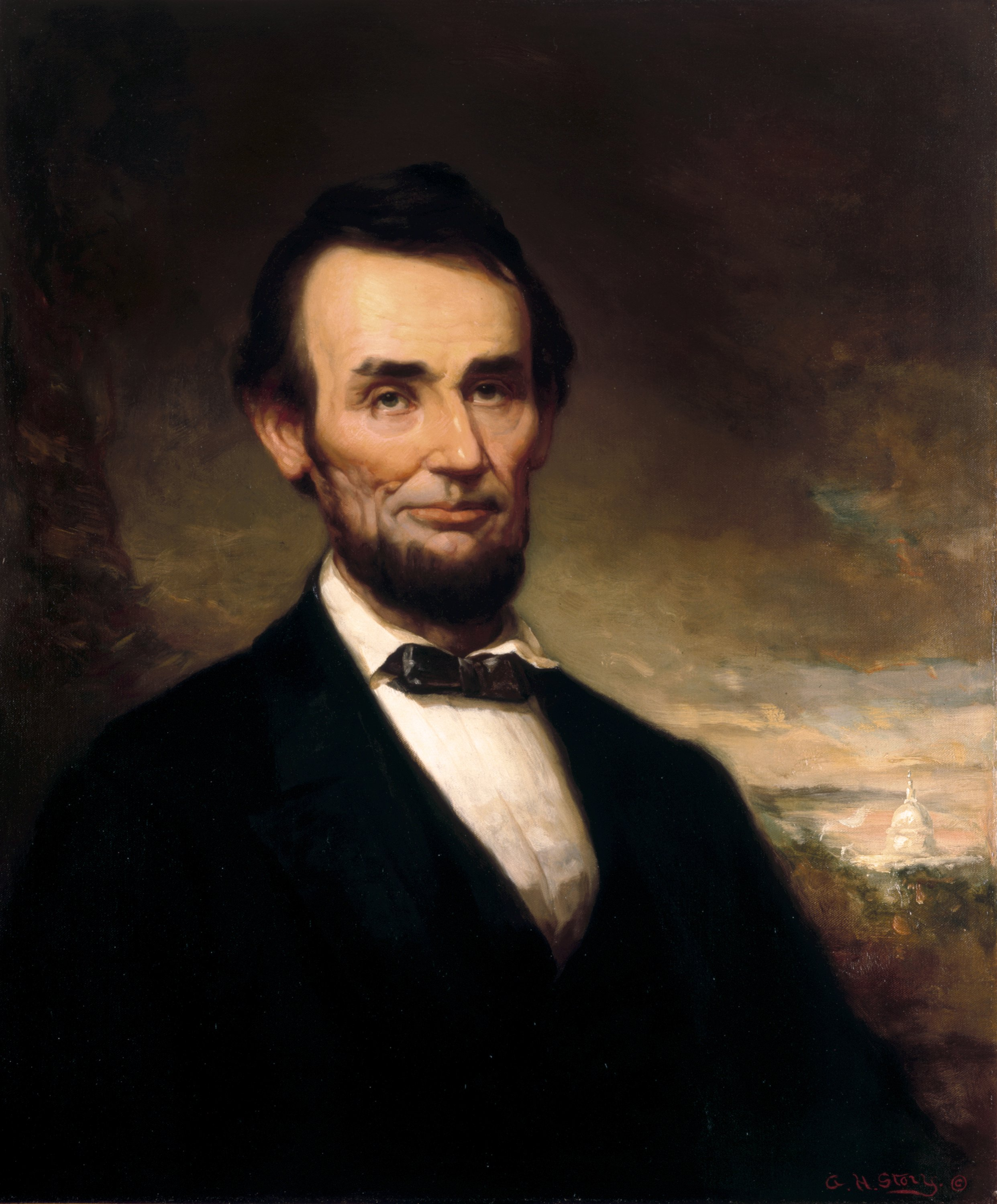
Abraham Lincoln by George Henry Story, c. 1915

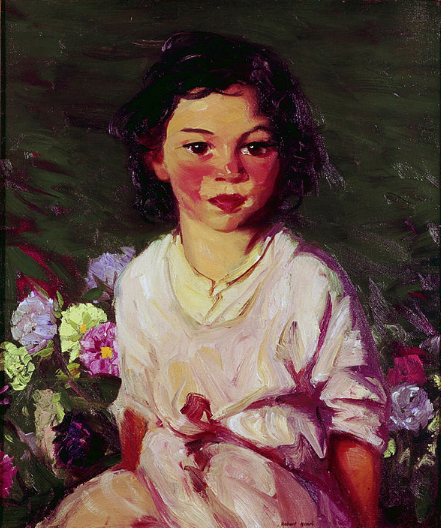
Gypsy Girl with Flowers by Robert Henri, 1915

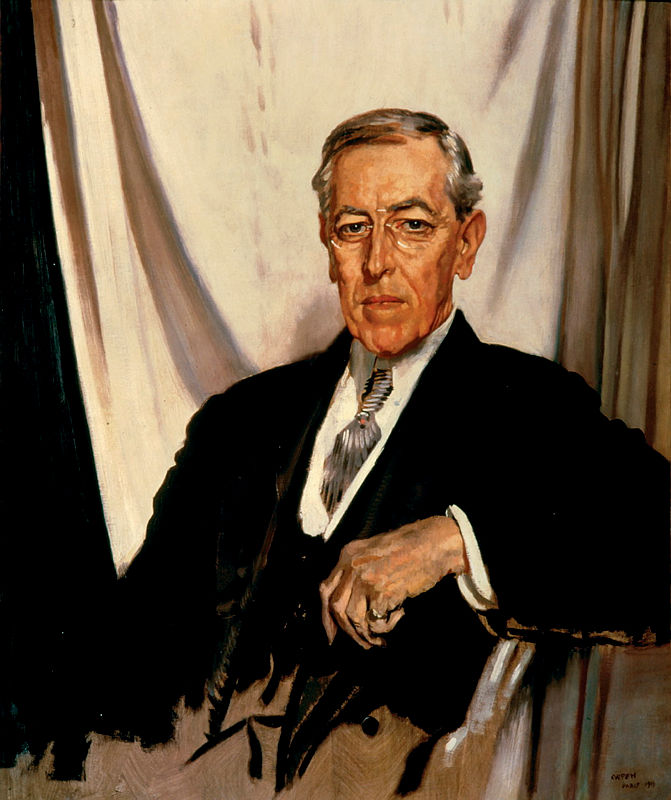
Woodrow Wilson by William Orpen, 1919

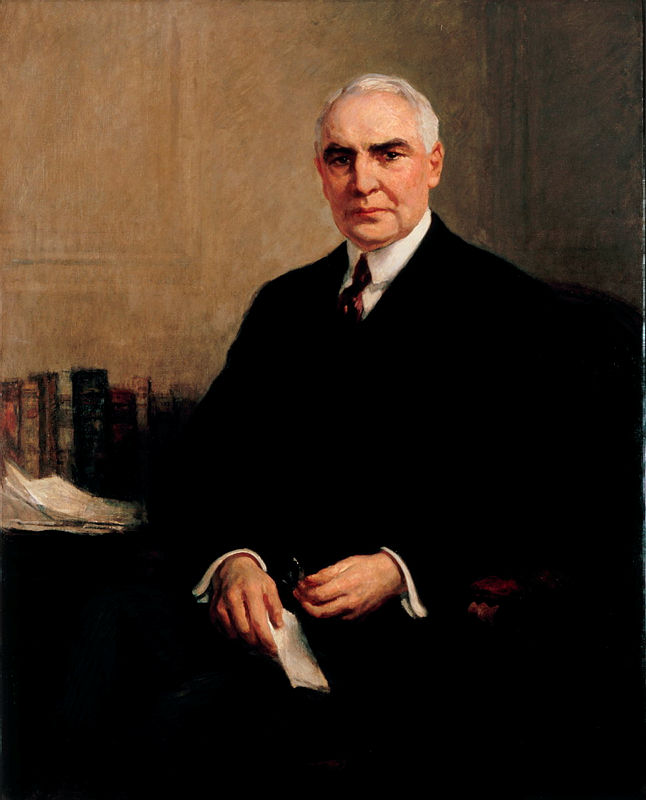
Warren G. Harding by Francis Luis Mora, 1930

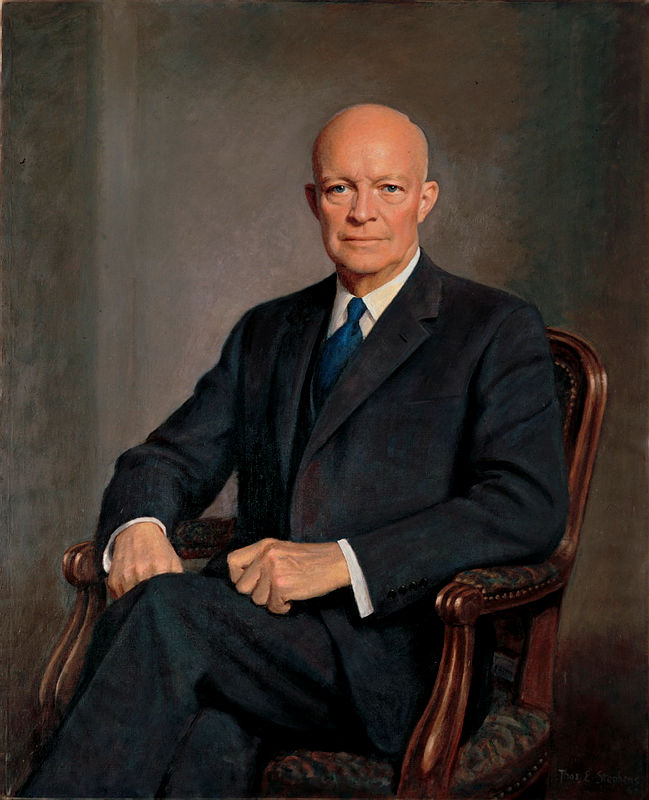
Dwight D. Eisenhower by Thomas E. Stephens, 1960

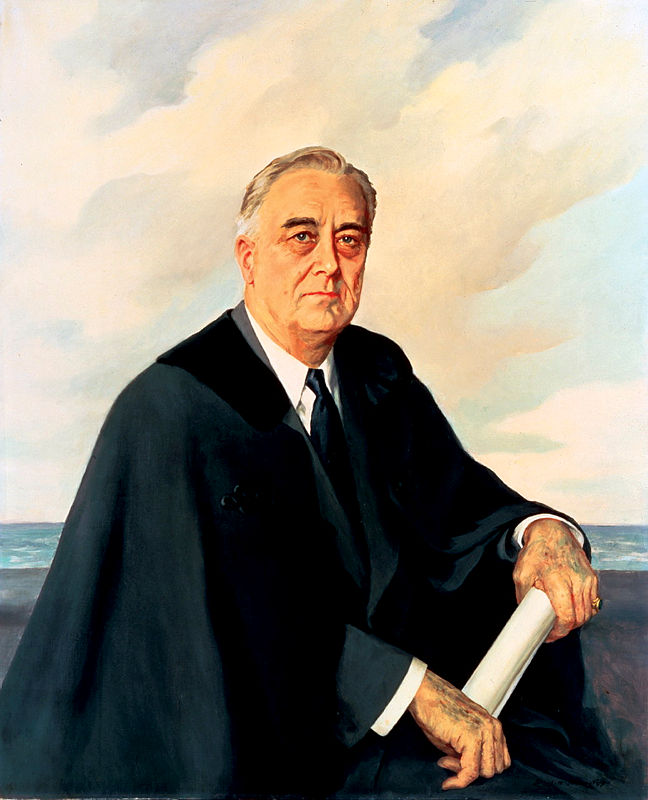
Franklin D. Roosevelt by Elizabeth Shoumatoff, 1966

=== Landscape paintings ===
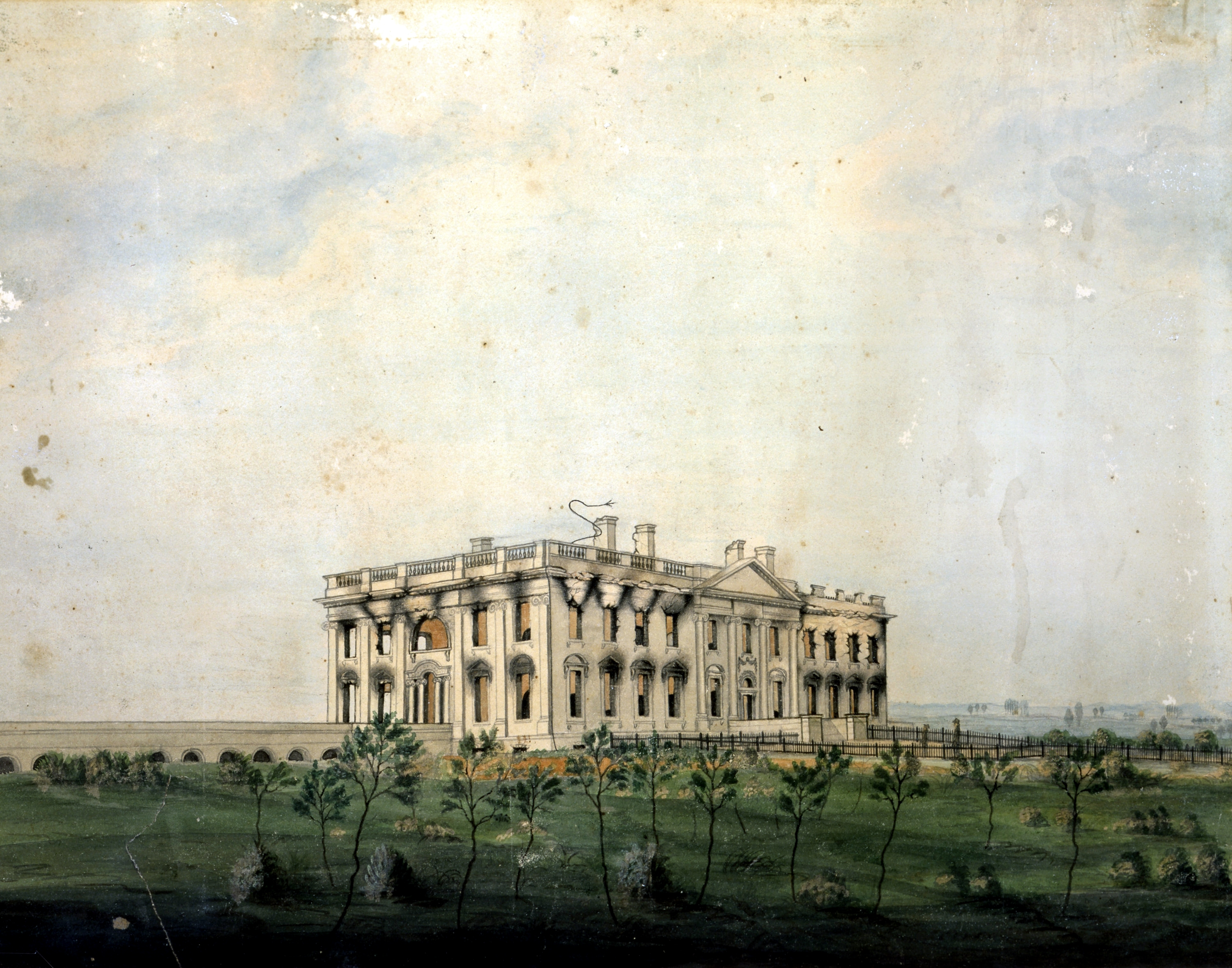
The President's House by George Munger, between c. 1814 and c. 1815

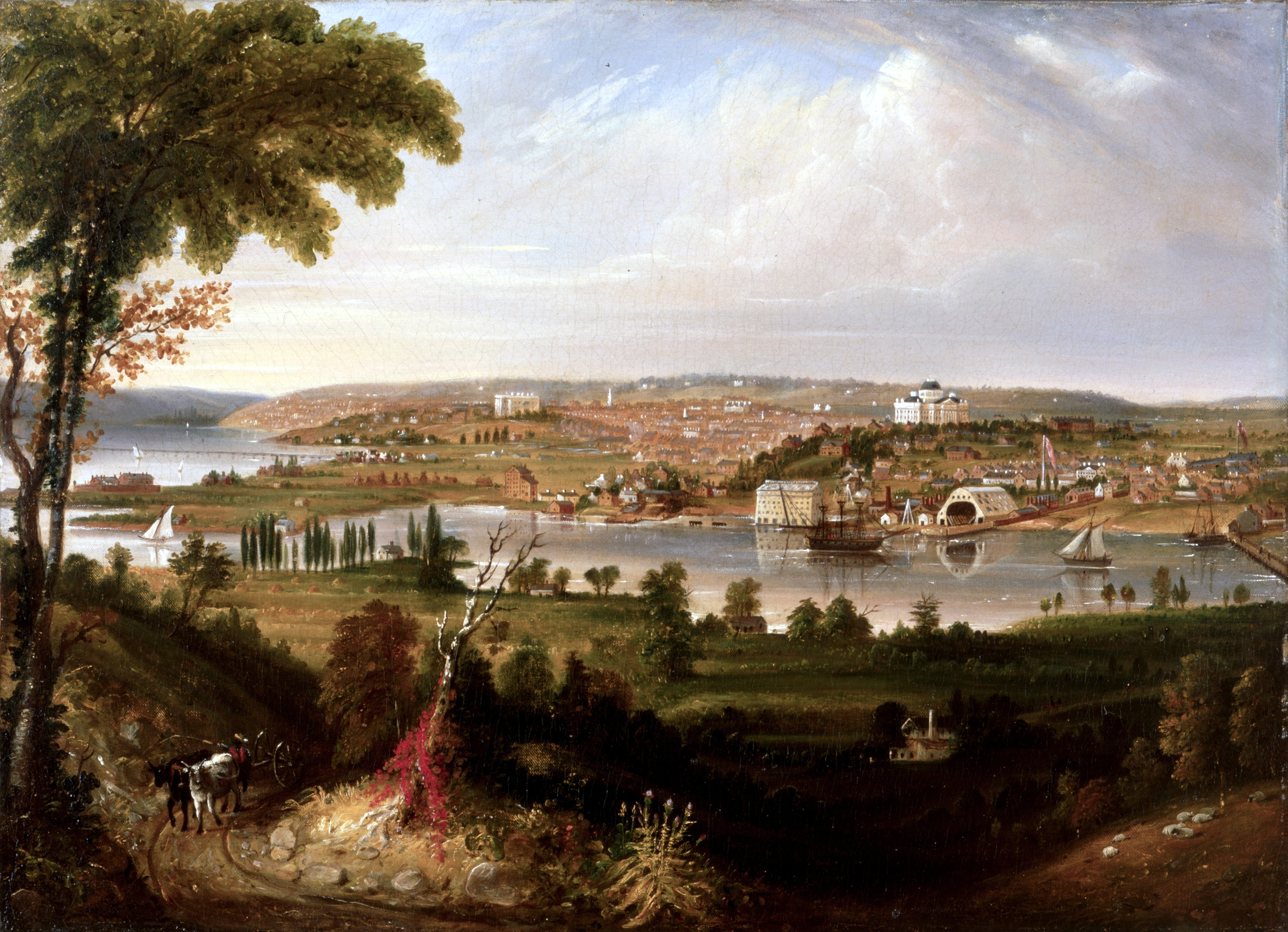
City of Washington from Beyond the Navy Yard by George Cooke, 1833

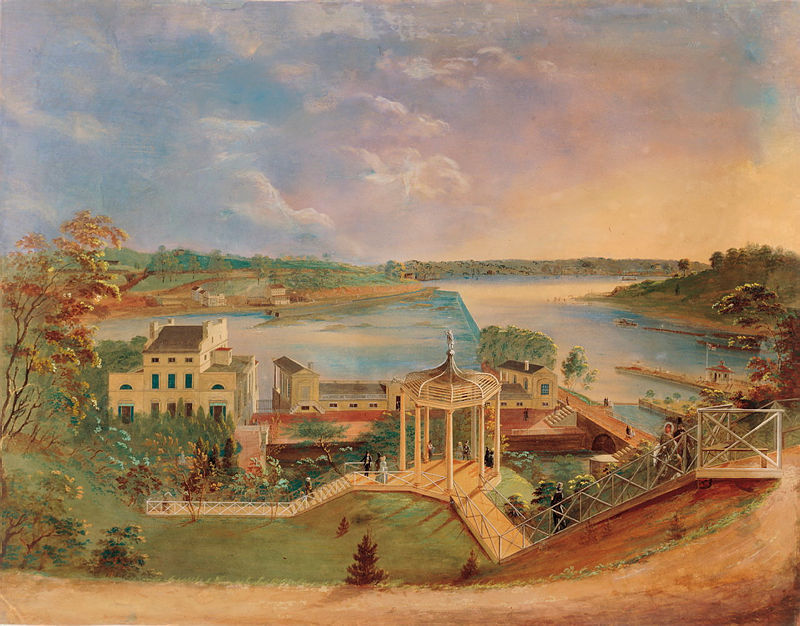
Fairmount Waterworks - Philadelphia by Nicolino Calyo, c. 1834

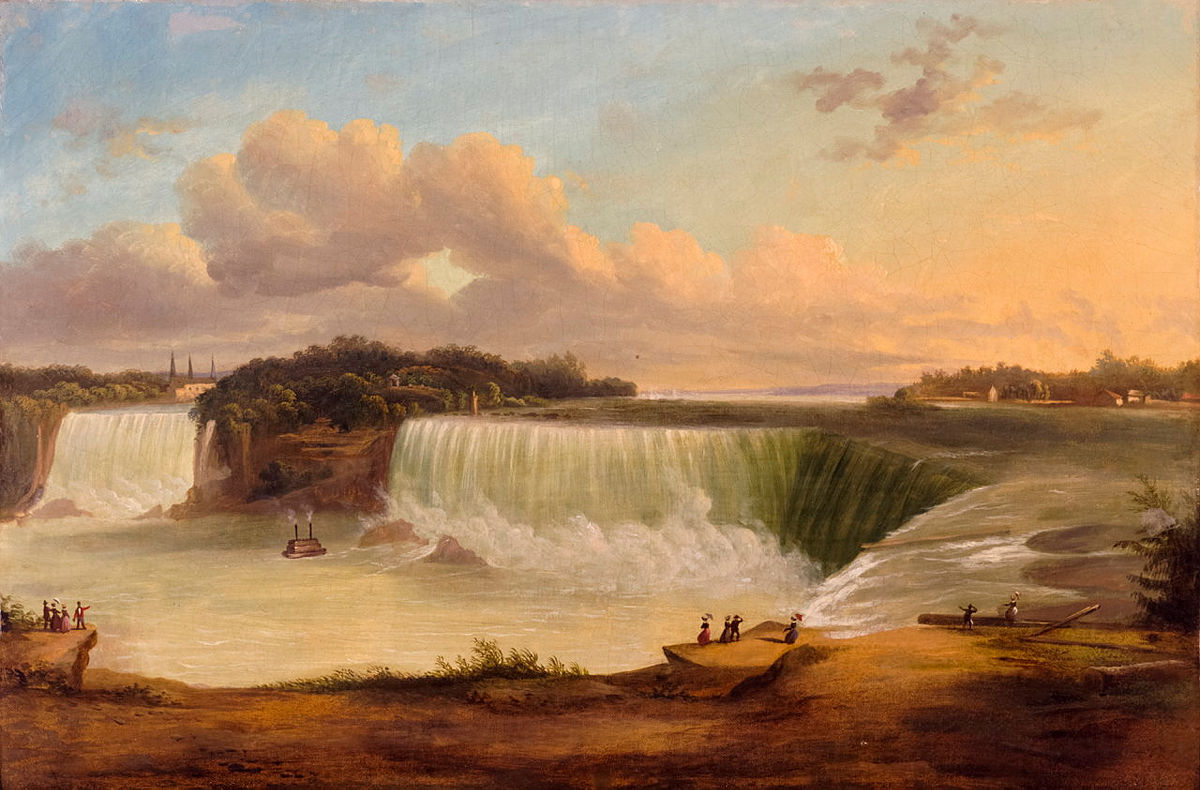
Niagara Falls From the Canadian Side by Victor de Grailly, c. 1845

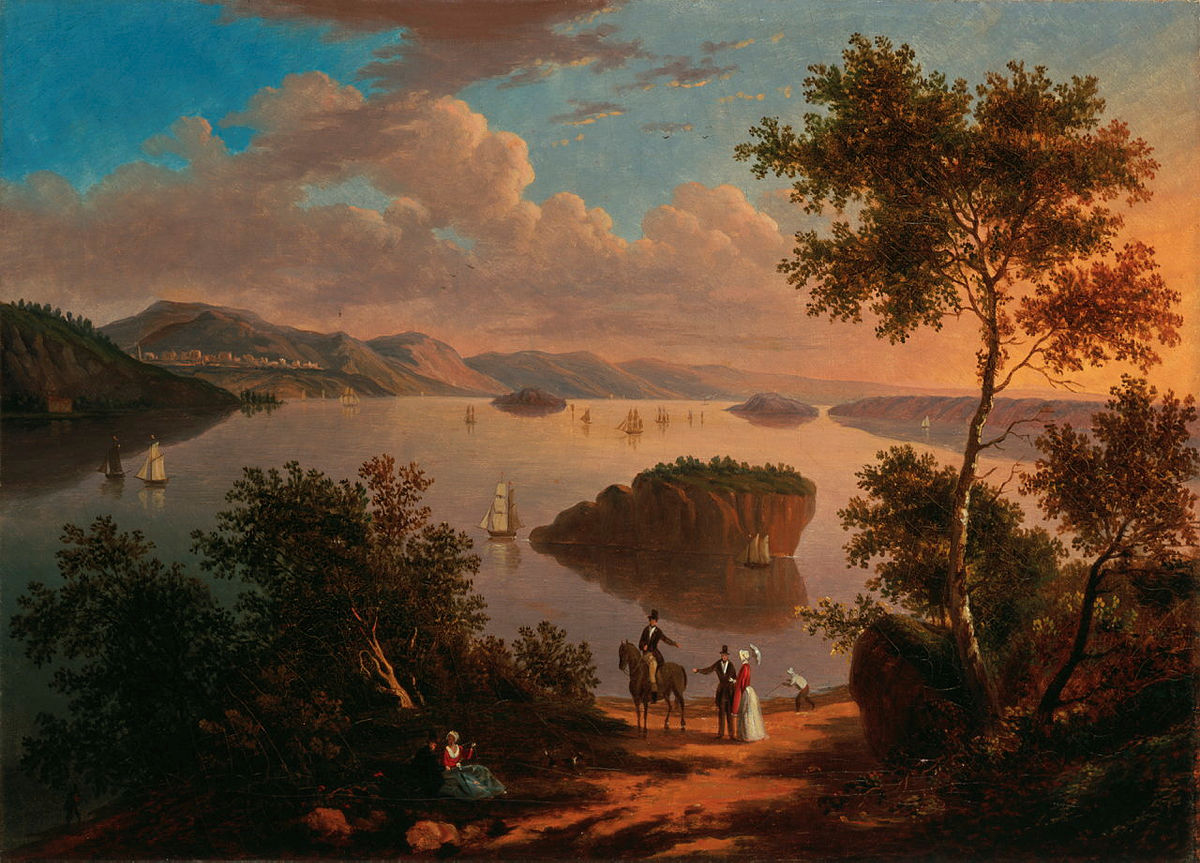
Eastport and Passamaquoddy Bay by Victor de Grailly, c. 1845

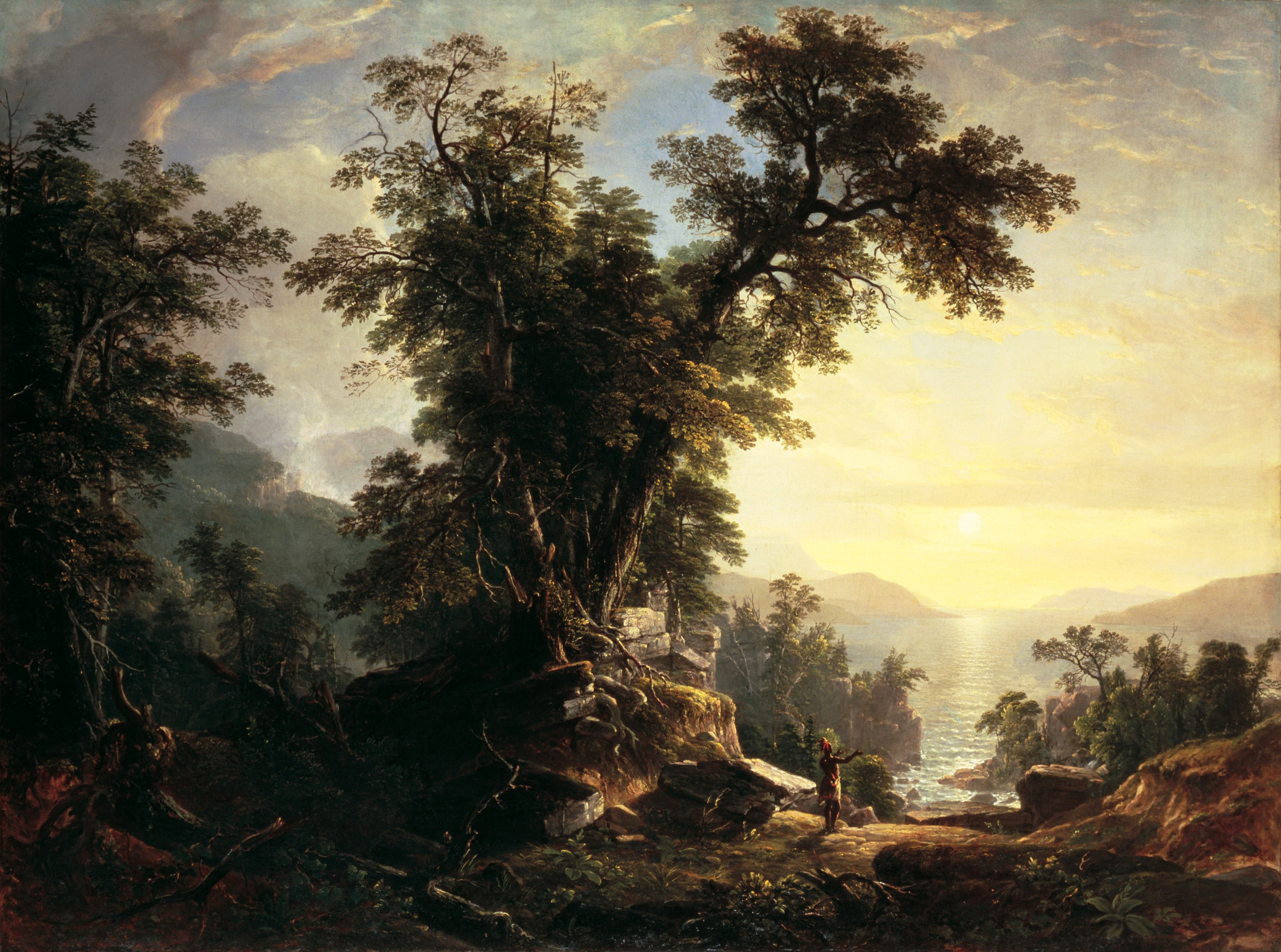
The Indian's Vespers by A. B. Durand, 1847

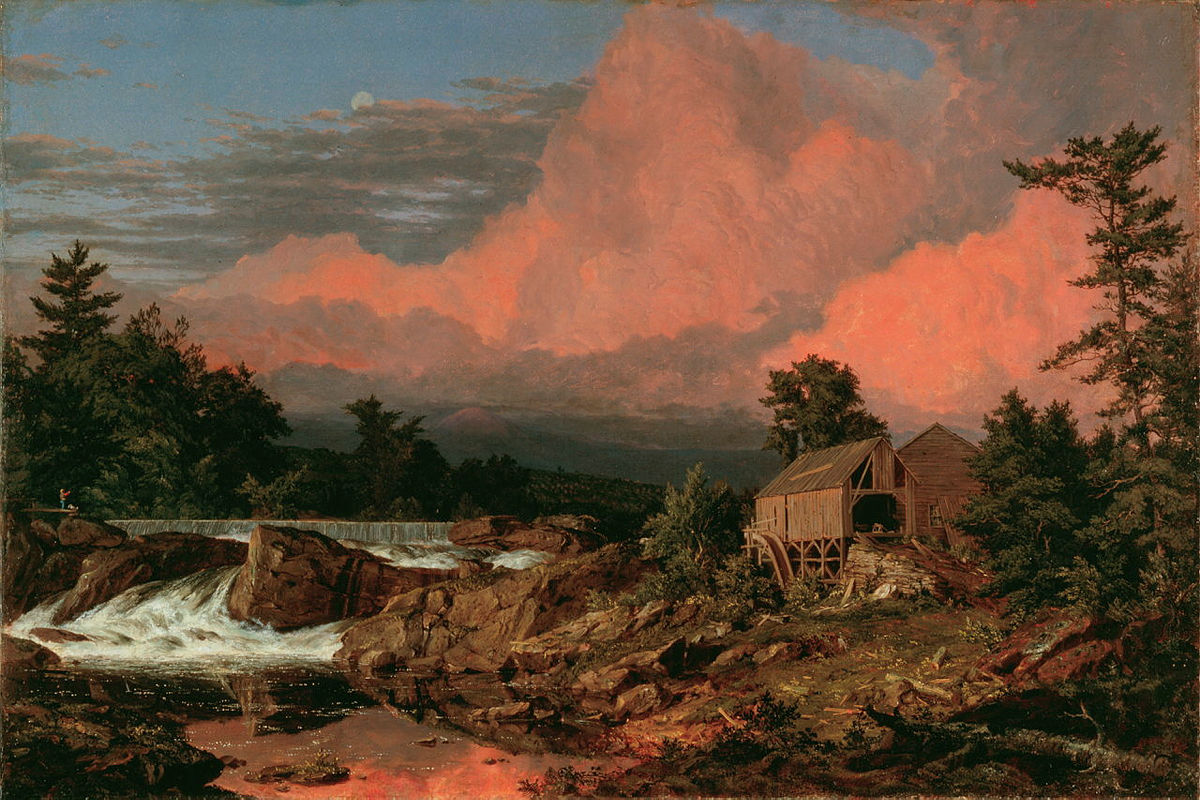
Rutland Falls, Vermont by Frederic Edwin Church, 1848

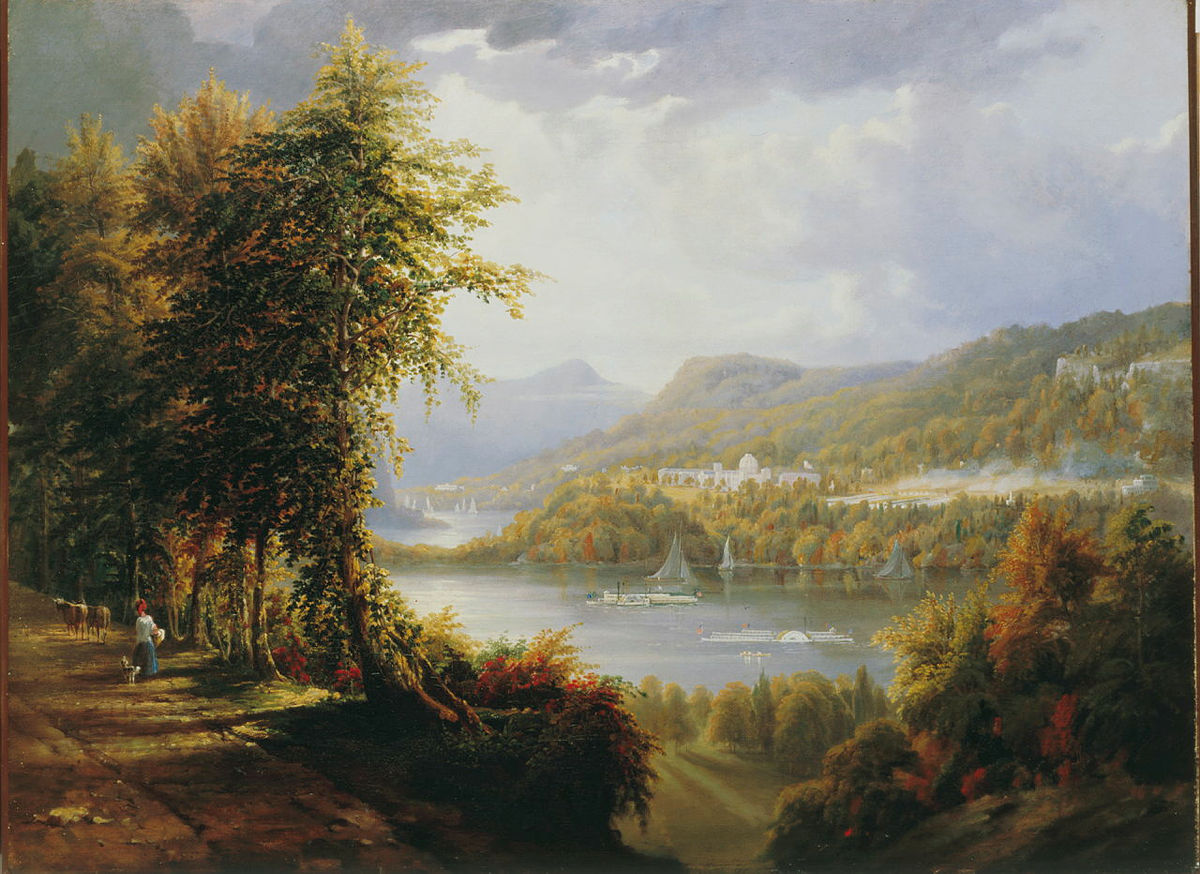
West Point Near Garrisons by Robert Havell, Jr., 1850

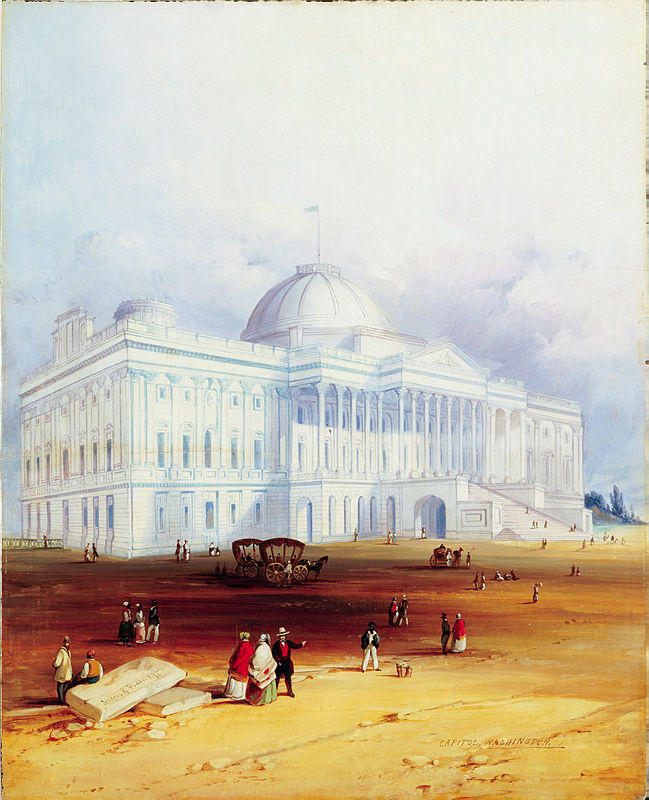
Capitol, Washington by Unknown, c. 1850-1860

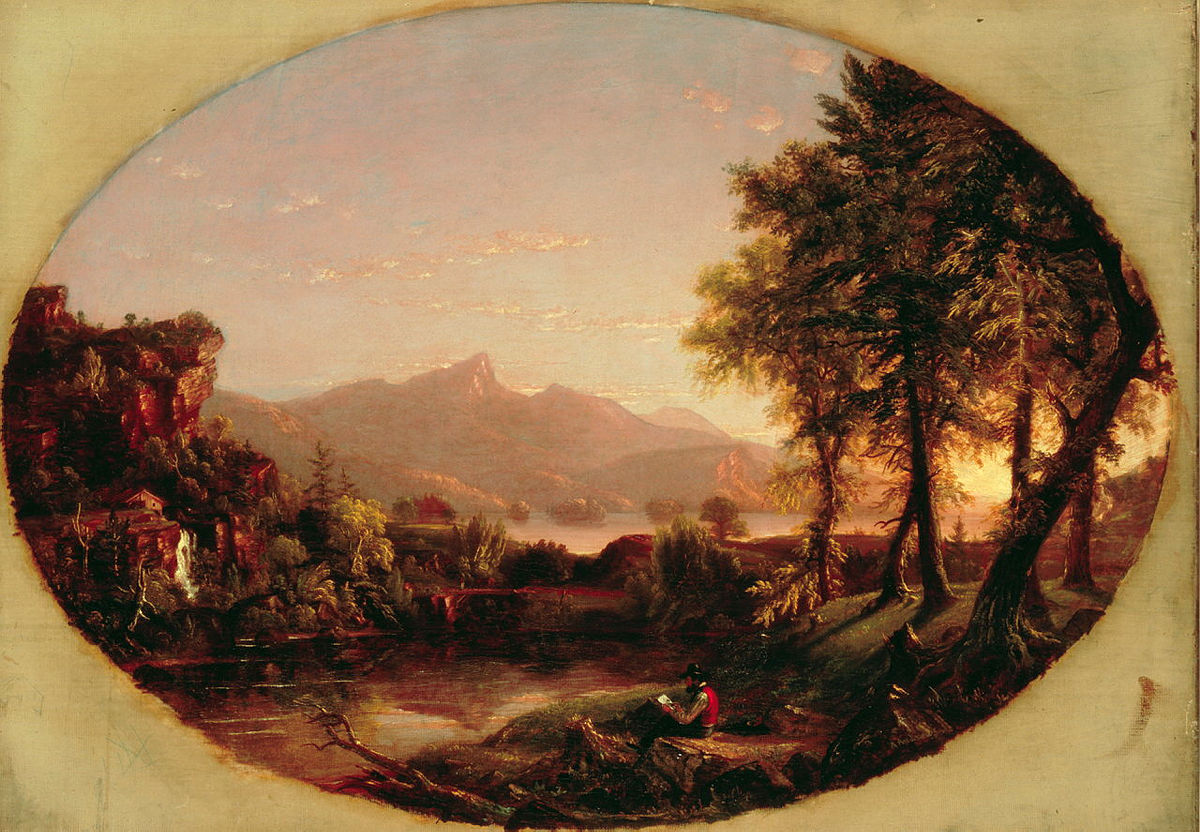
View of Lake George by Andrew Andrews, c. 1850−1860

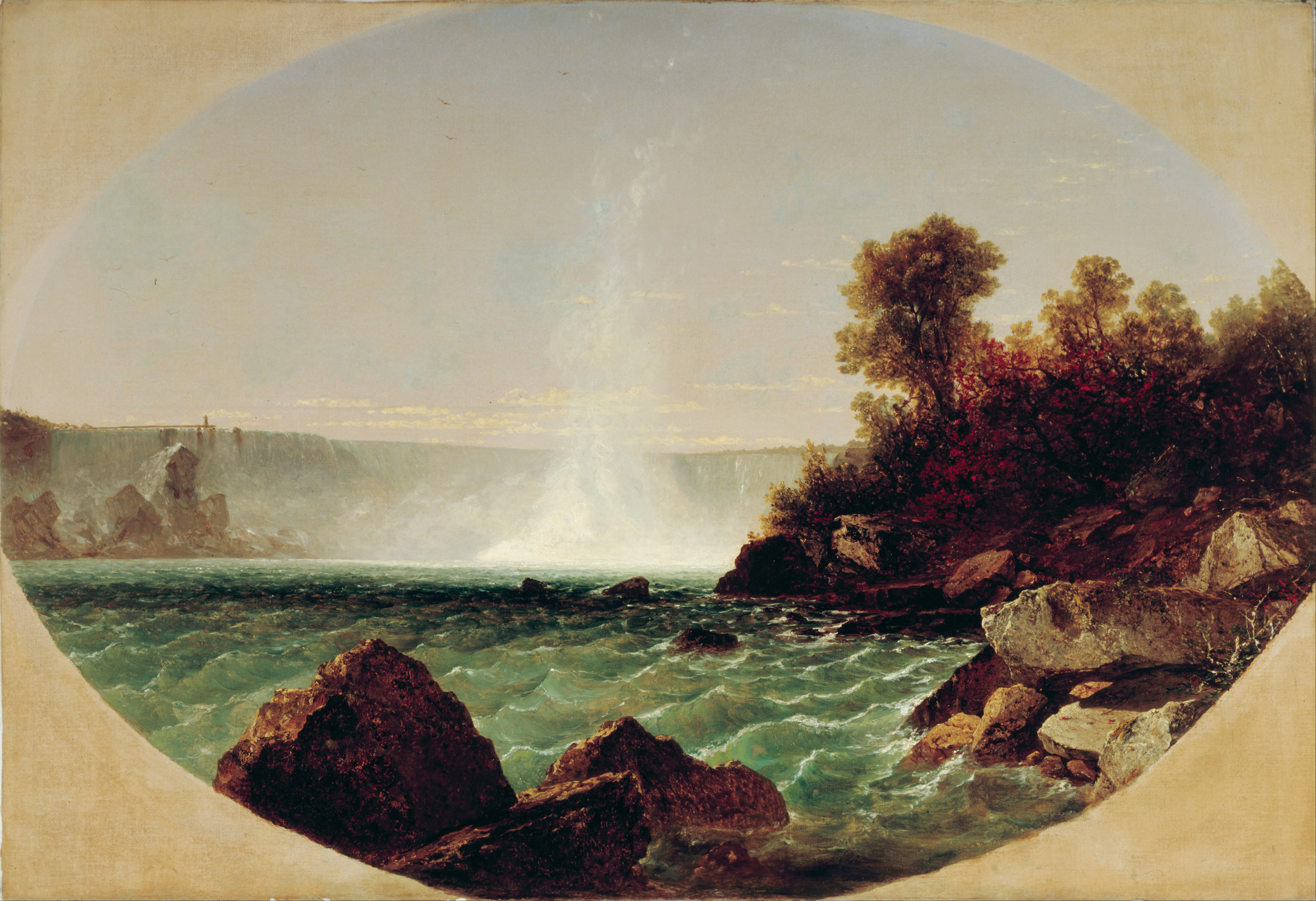
Niagara Falls by John Frederick Kensett, c. 1852−1854

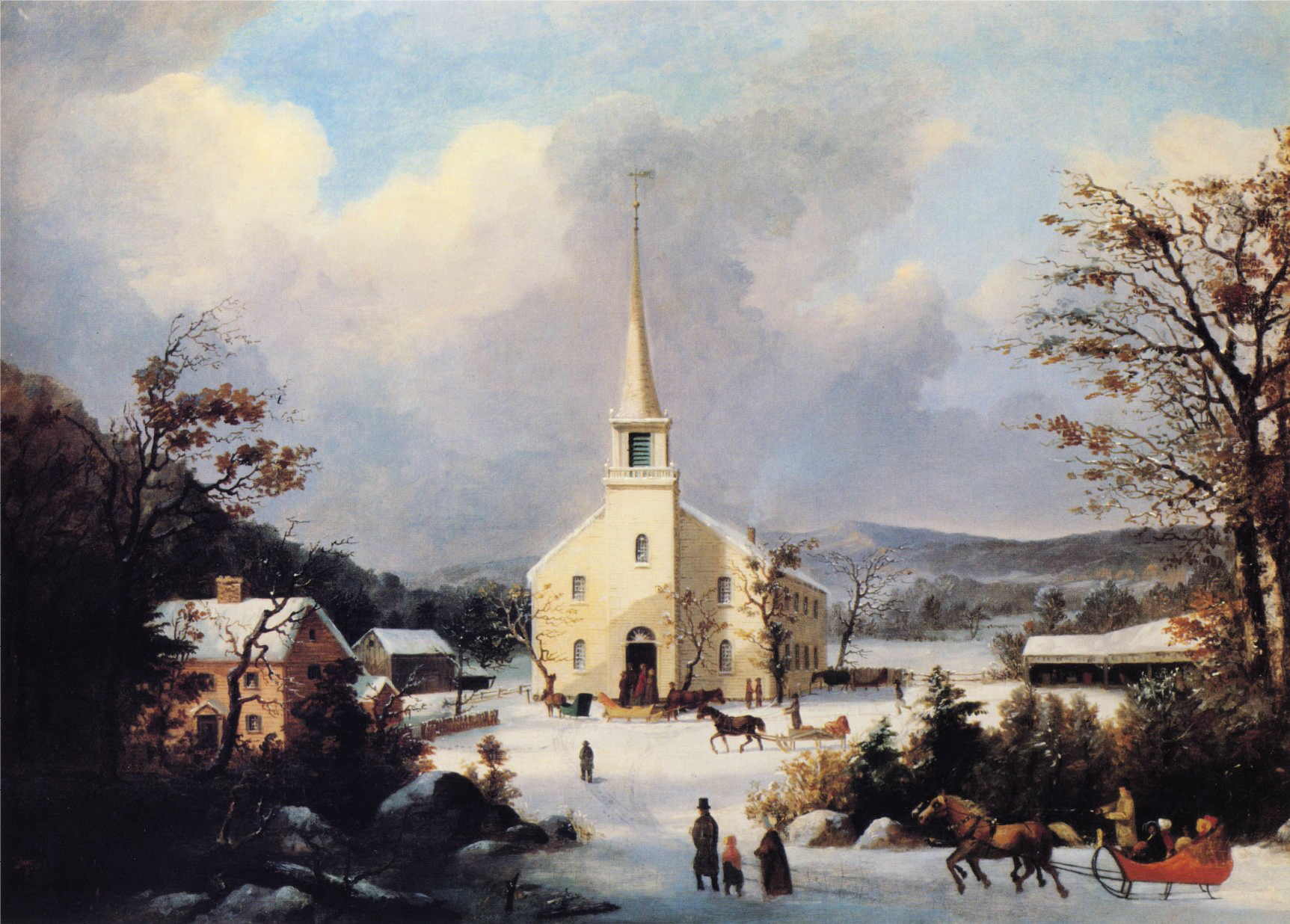
Going to Church by George Henry Durrie, 1853

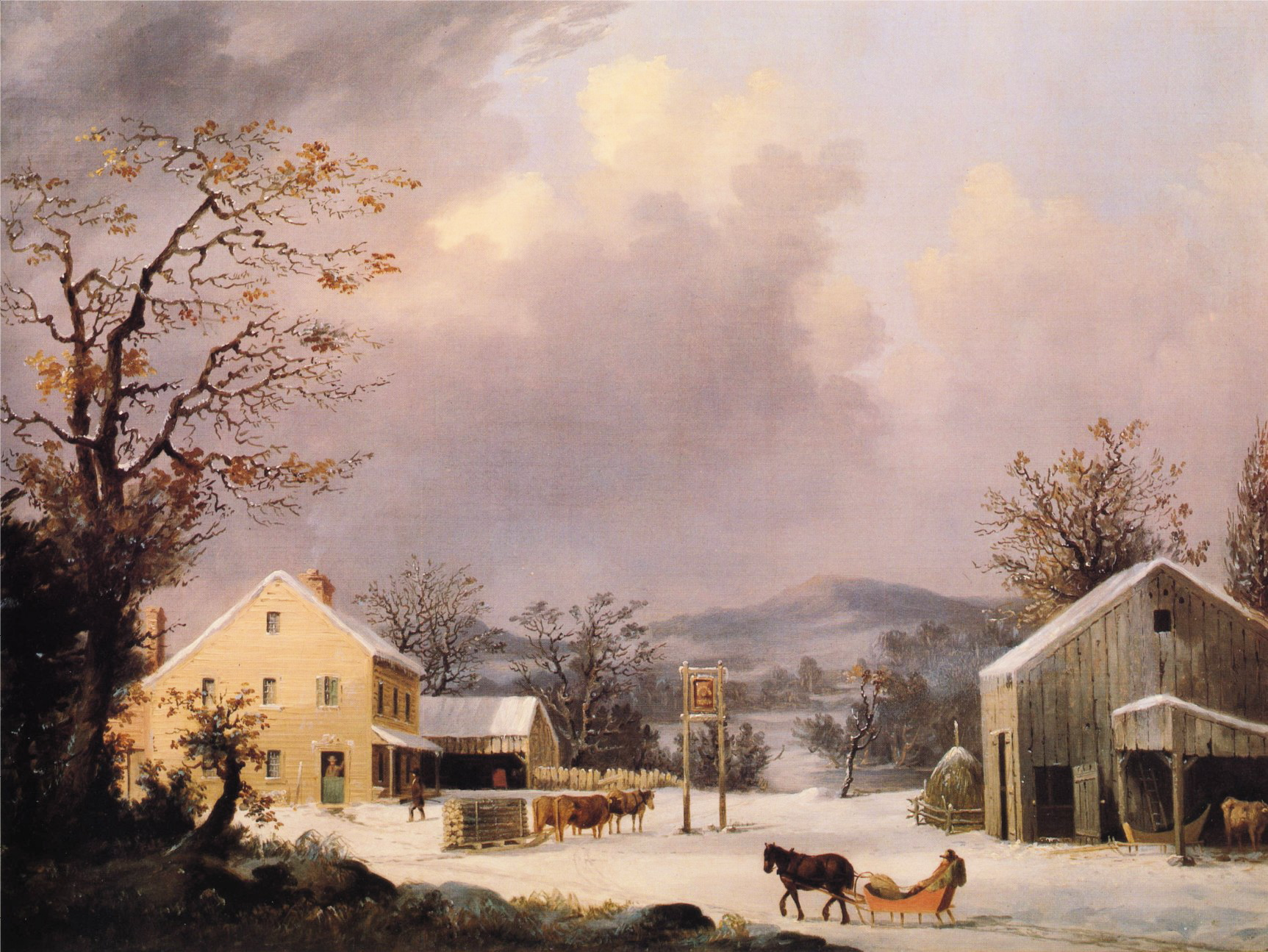
Jones Inn, Winter by George Henry Durrie, 1853

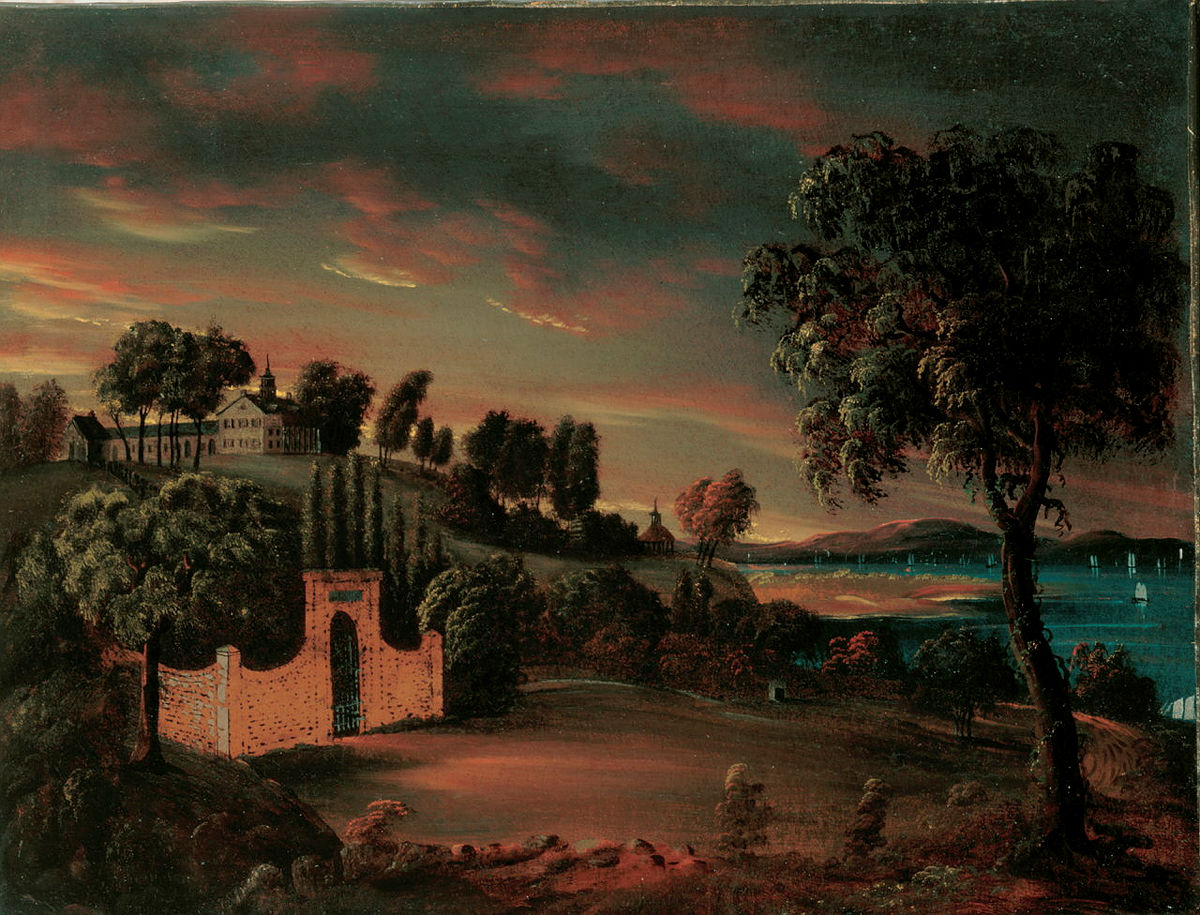
Washington's Tomb at Mount Vernon by William Matthew Prior, c. 1853

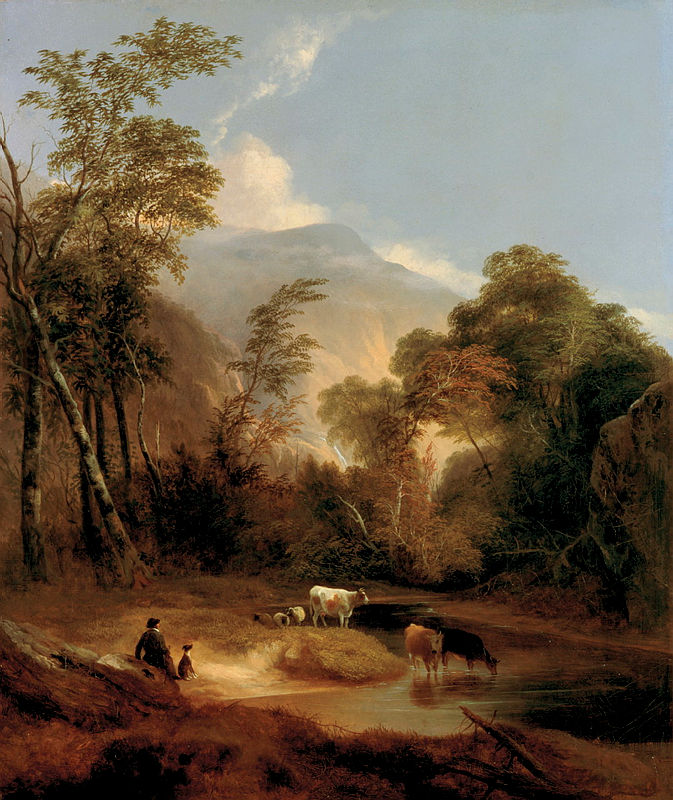
Pastoral Landscape by Alvan Fisher, 1854

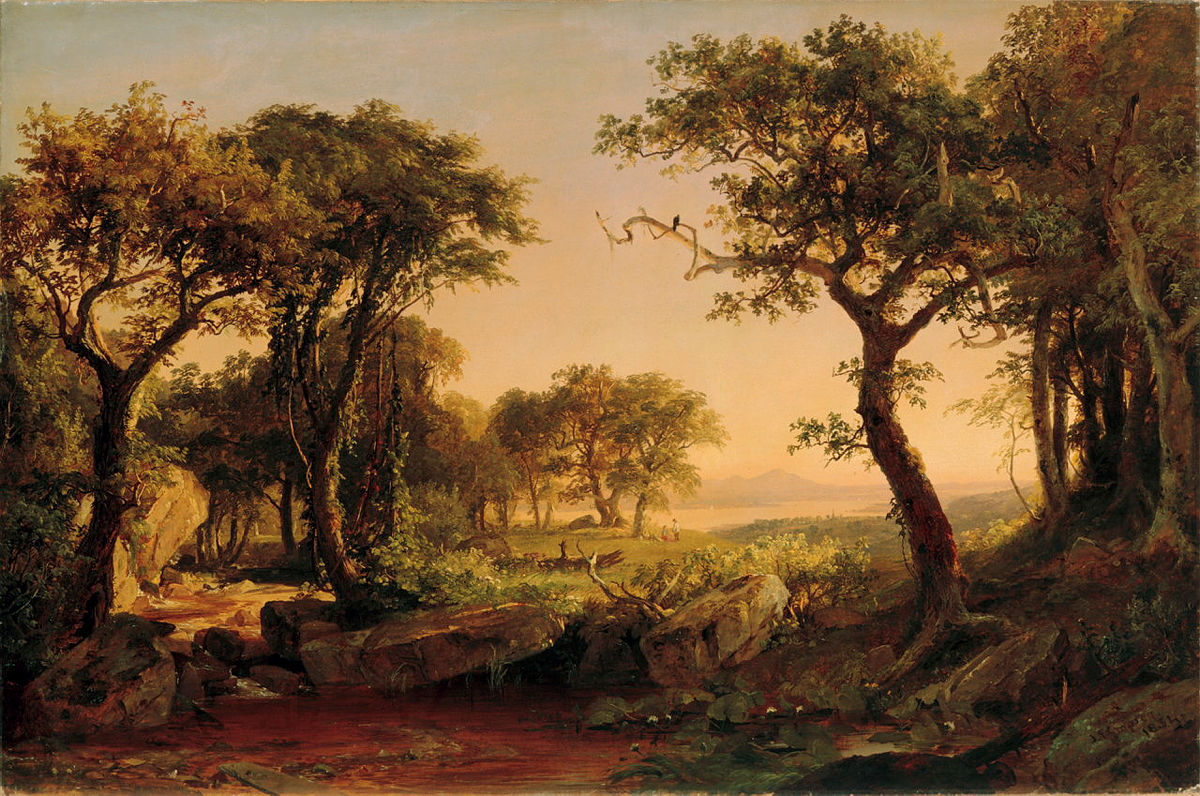
A Mountain Glimpse by Jasper Francis Cropsey, 1854

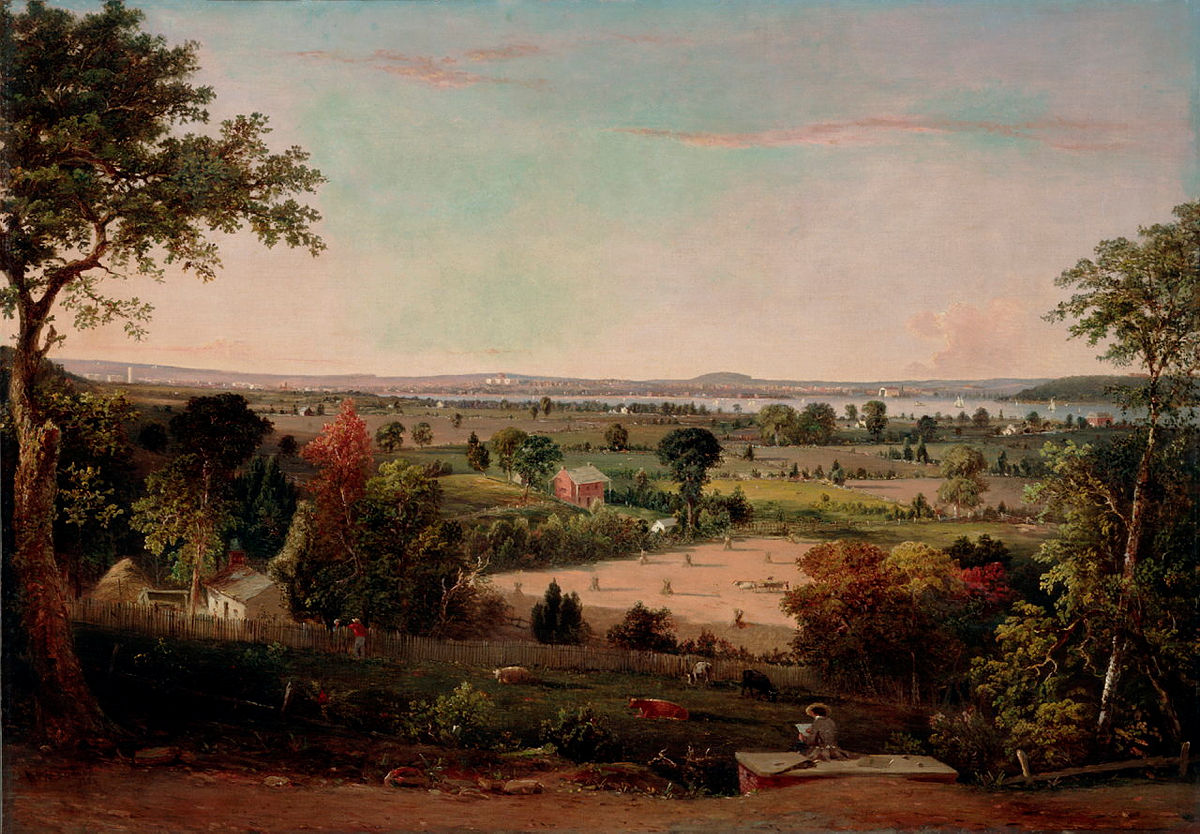
View of the City of Washington from the Virginia Shore by William MacLeod, 1856

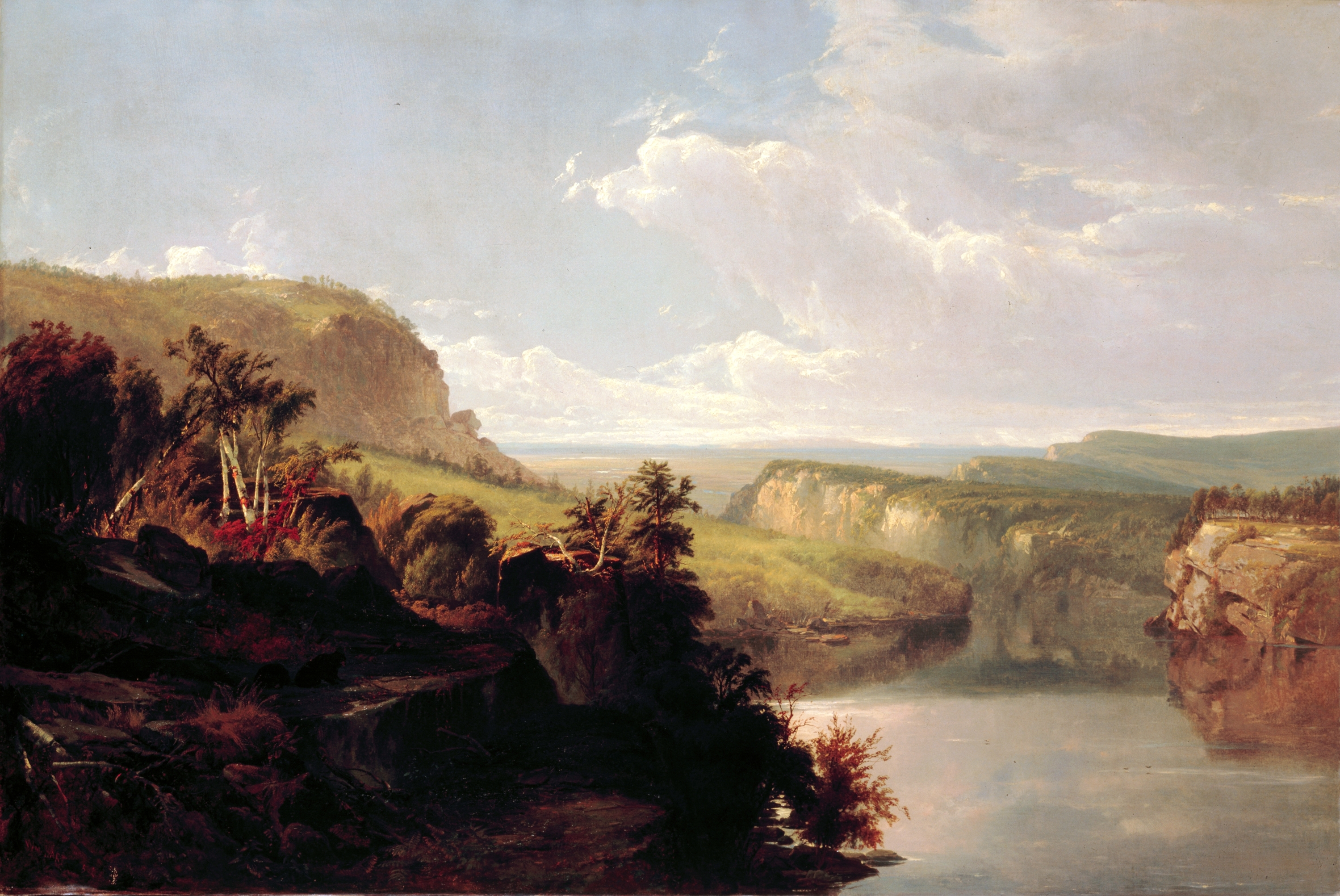
Lake Among the Hills (Lake Mohonk) by William Hart, 1858

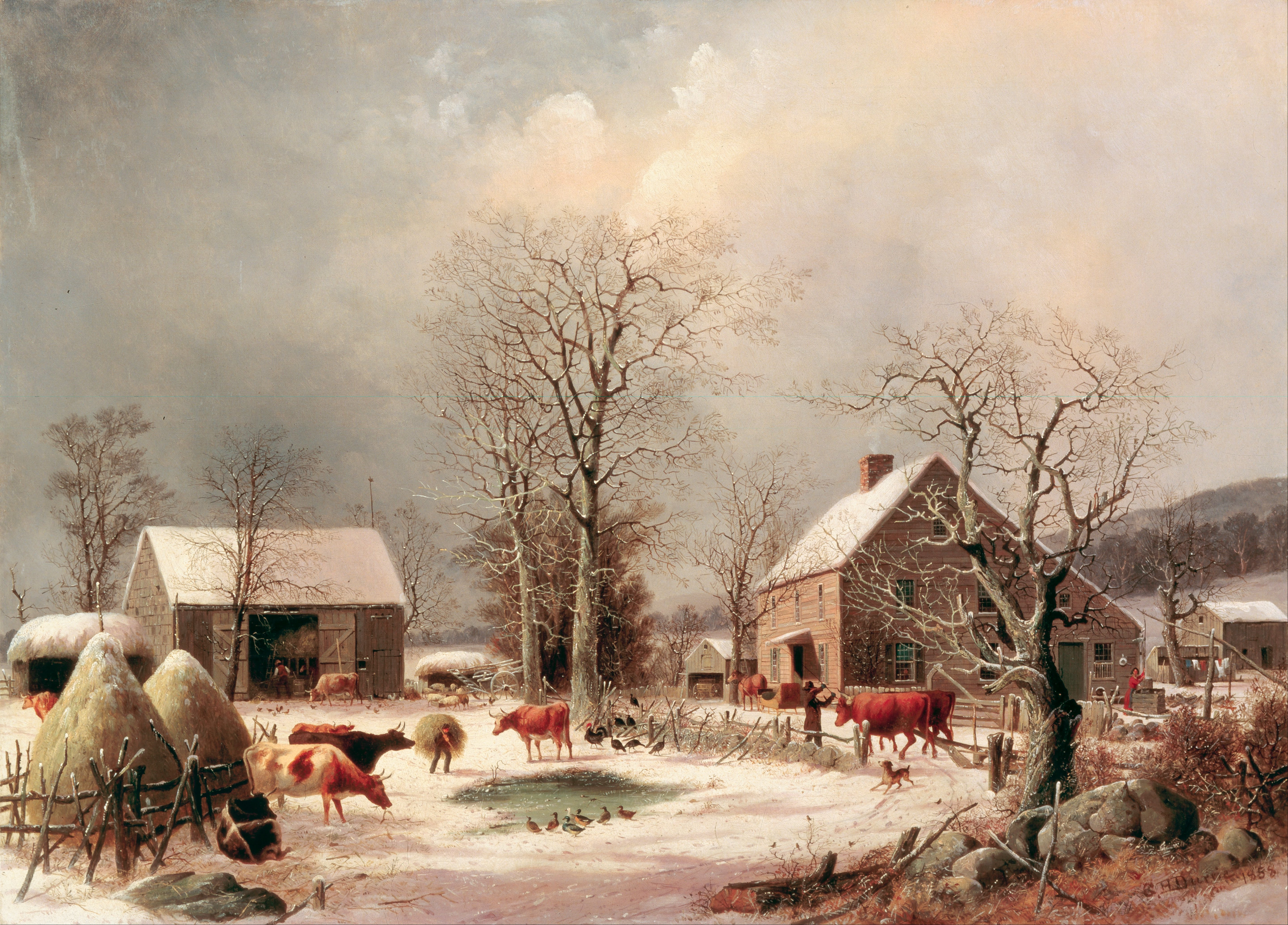
Farmyard in Winter by George Henry Durrie, 1858

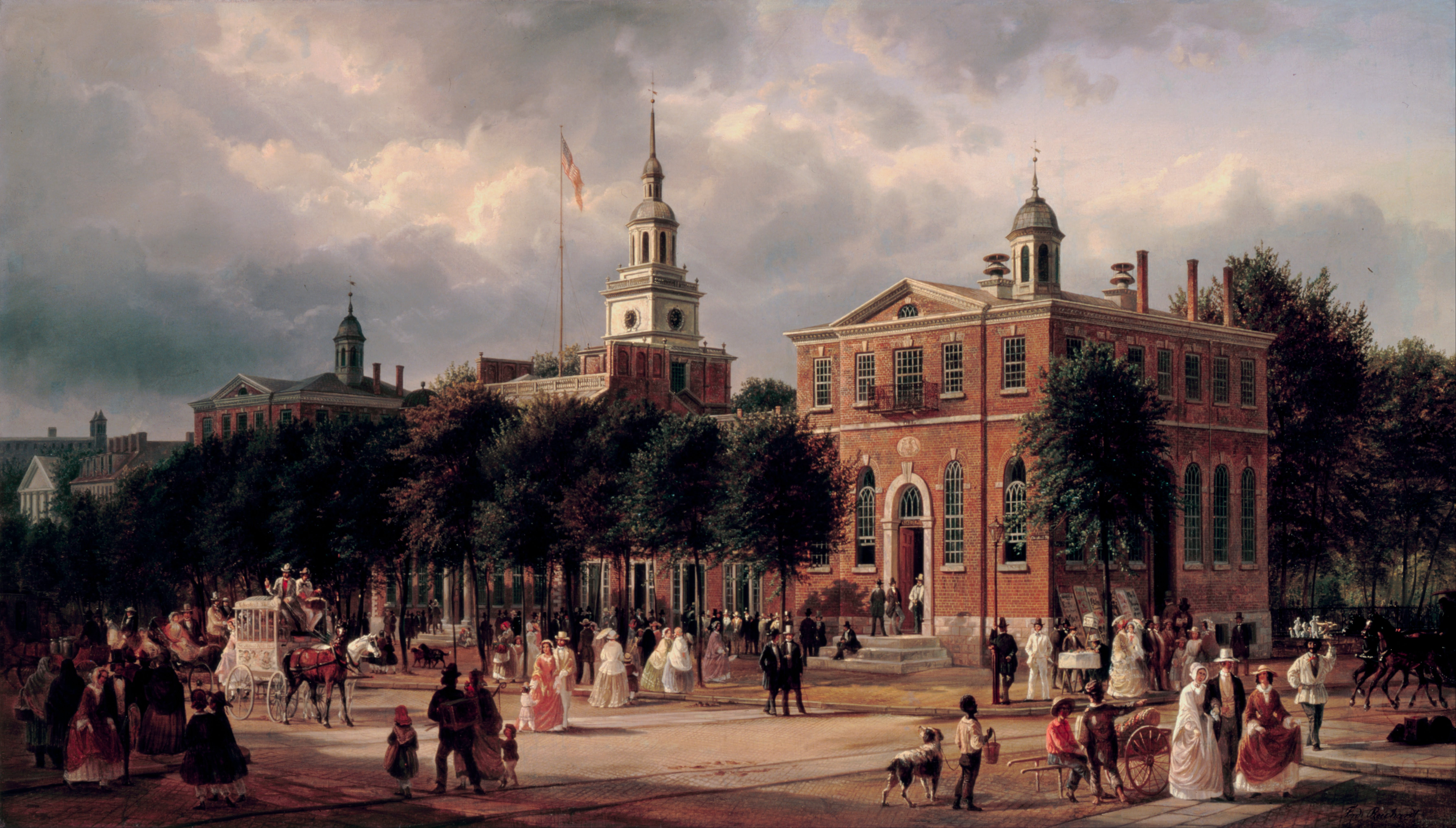
Independence Hall in Philadelphia by Ferdinand Richardt, c. 1858-1863

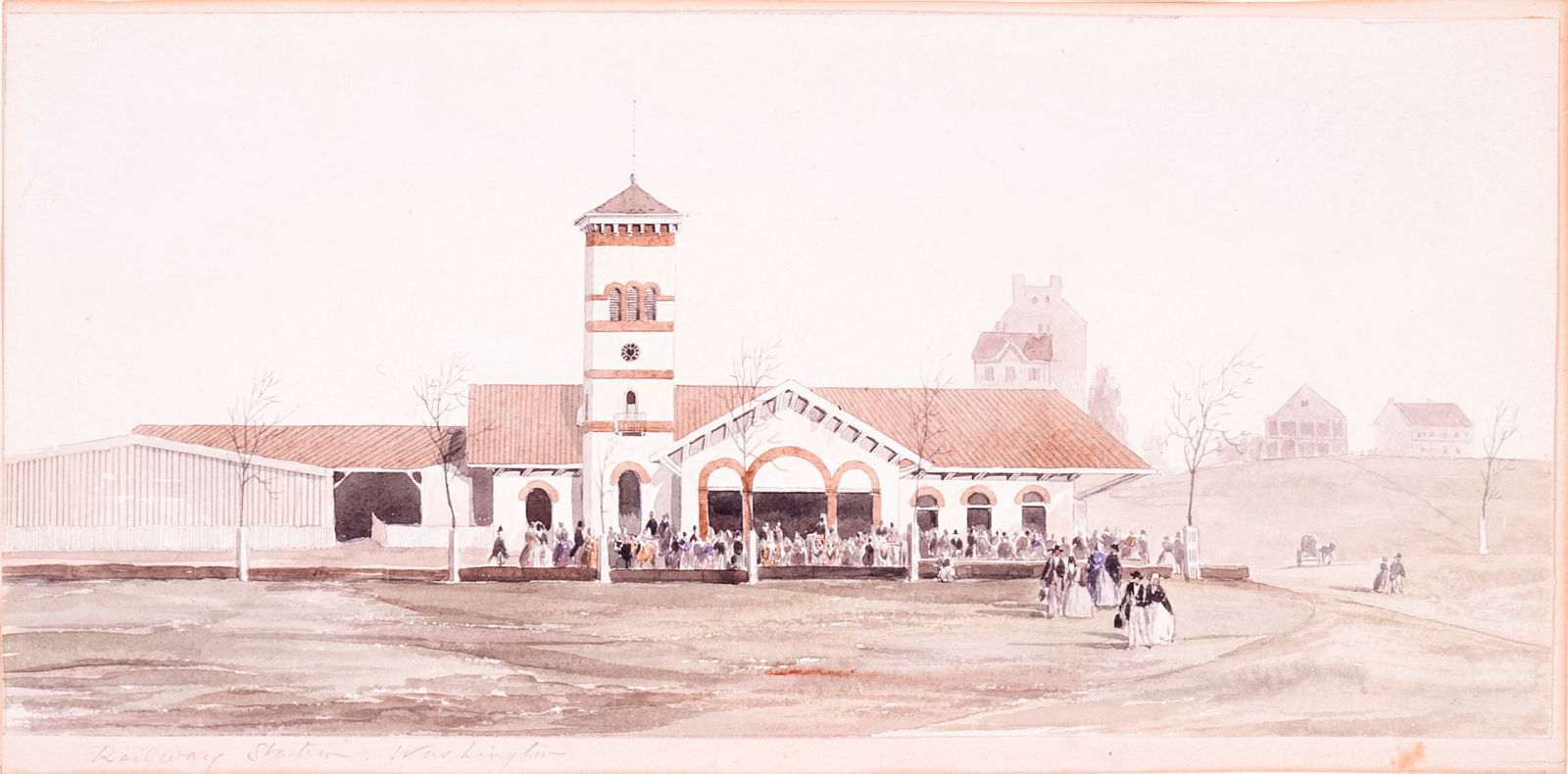
Railway Station by Lefevre Cranstone, 1860

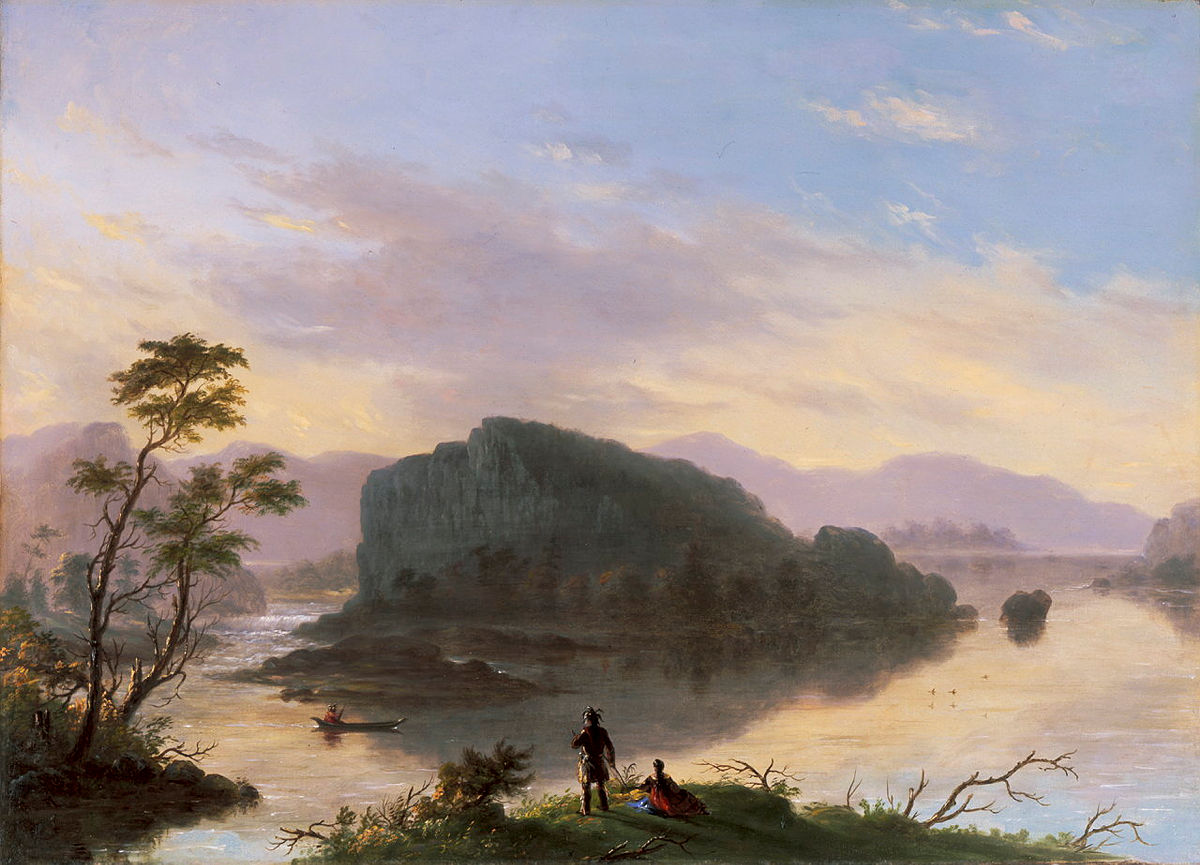
Hudson River Scene by Shepard Alonzo Mount, 1861

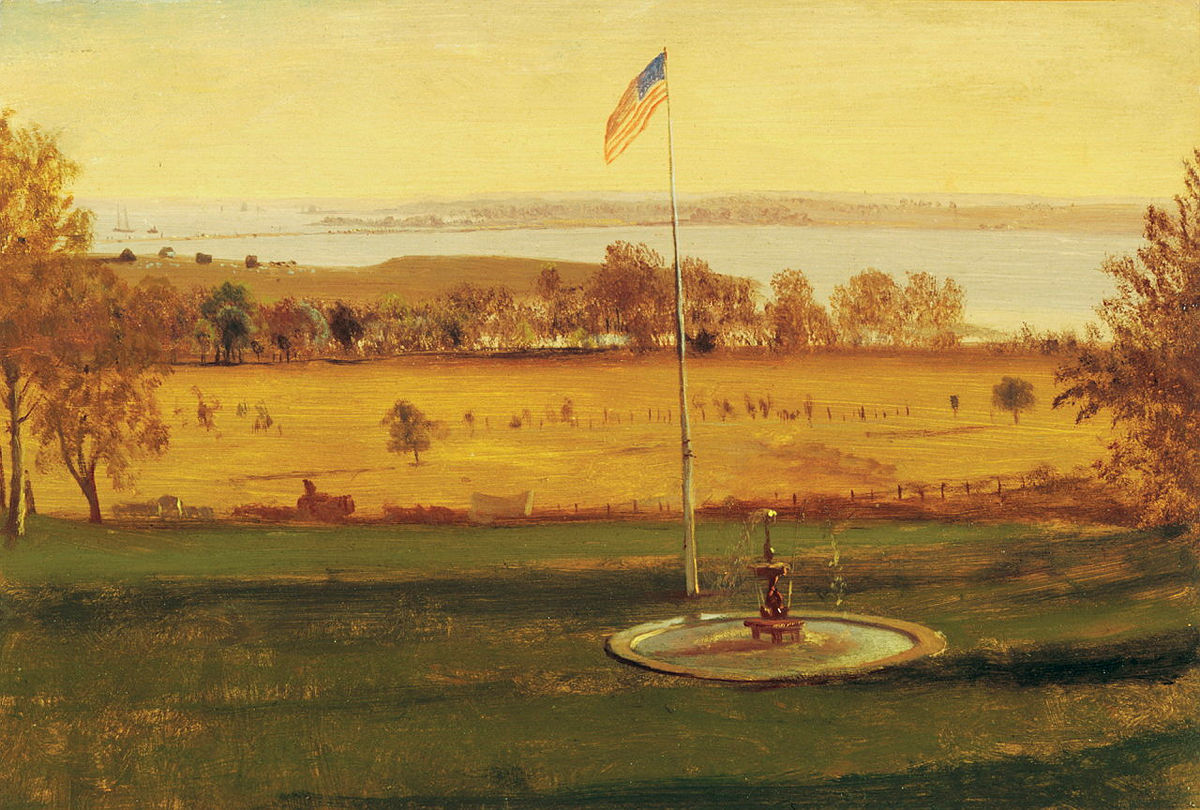
Washington, D.C. by Albert Bierstadt, c. 1863

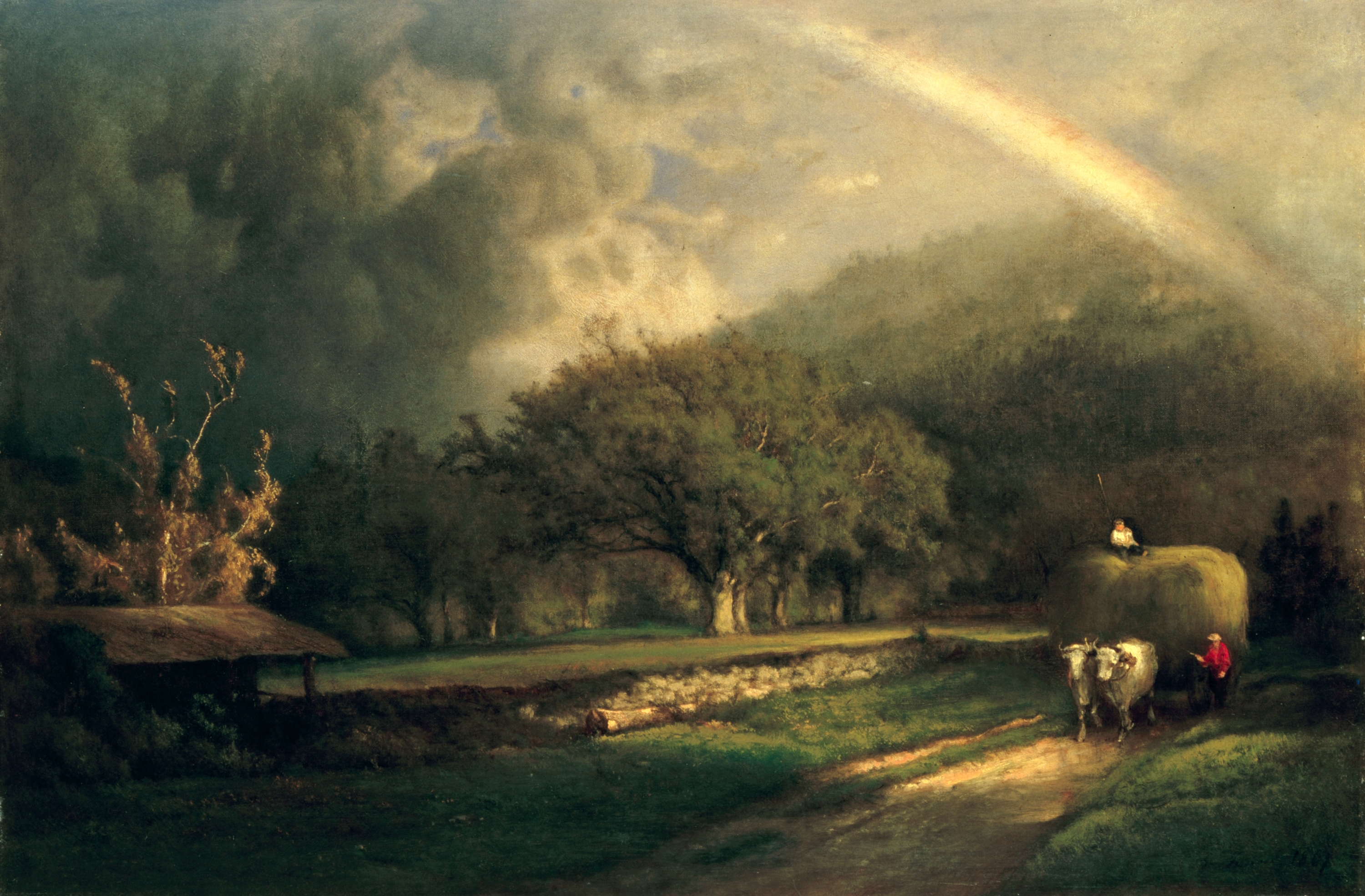
The Rainbow in the Berkshire Hills by George Inness, 1869

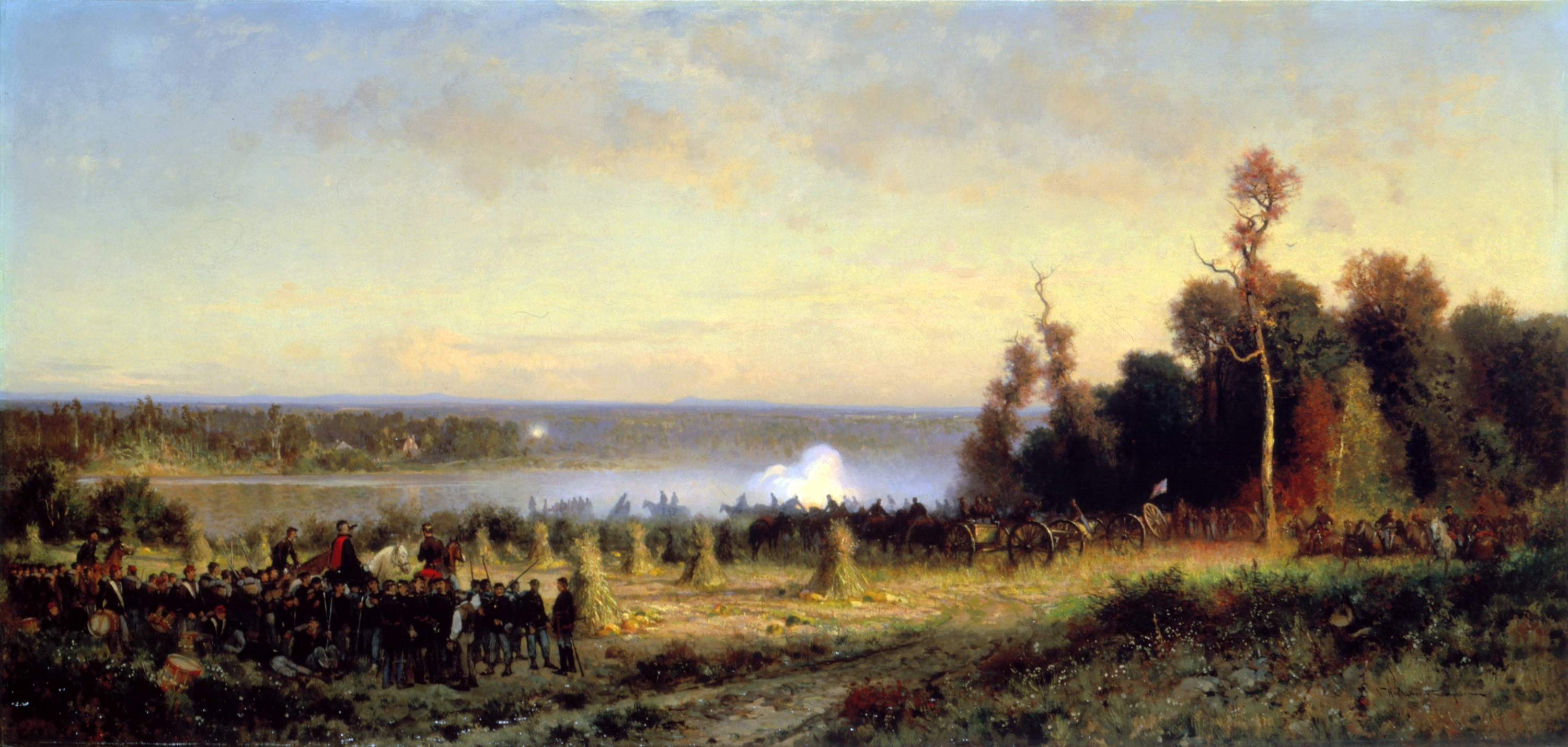
Cannonading on the Potomac by Alfred W. Thompson, c. 1869

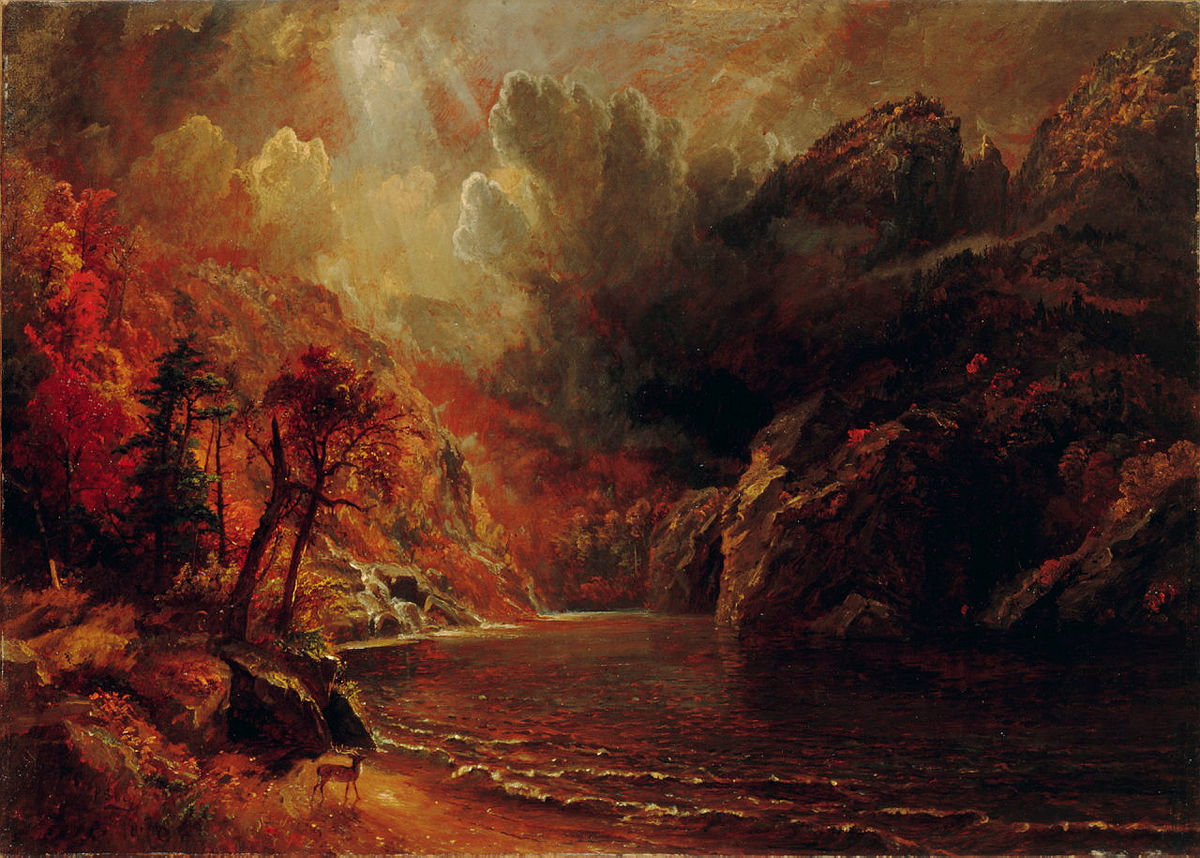
Deer by a Lake by Jasper Francis Cropsey, 1870

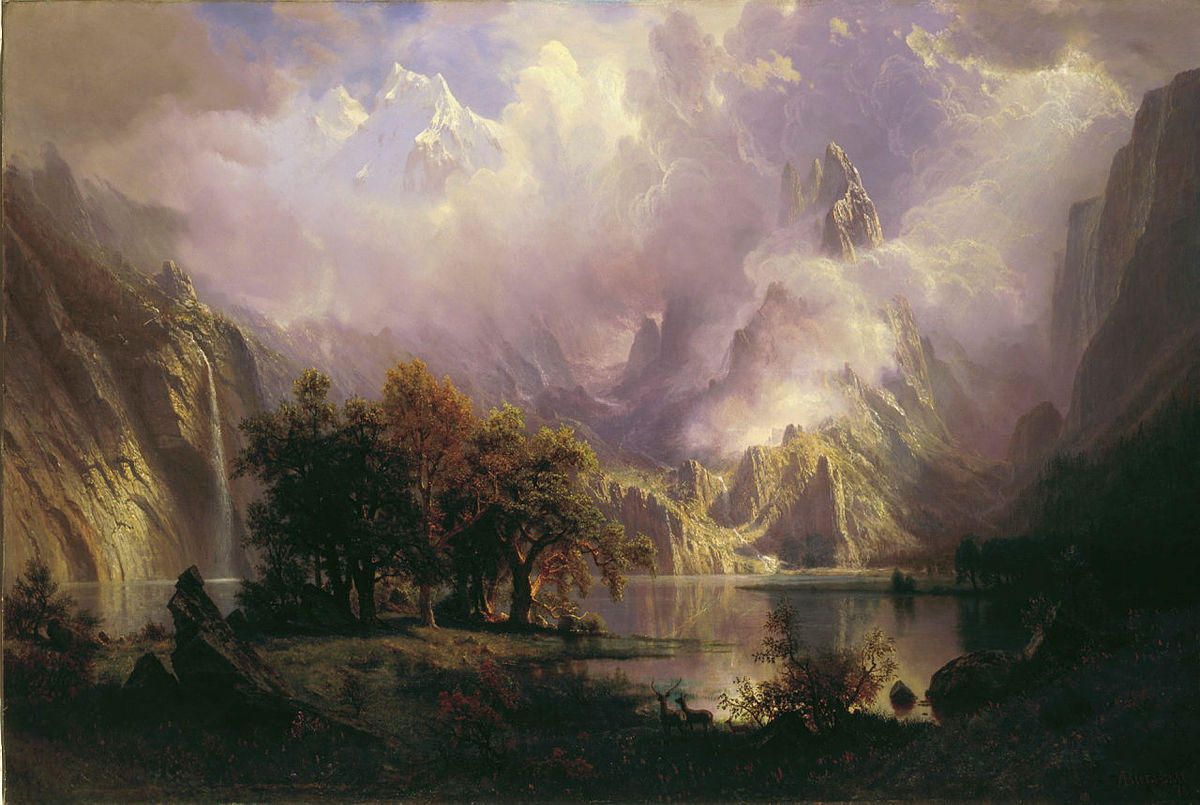
Rocky Mountain Landscape by Albert Bierstadt, 1870

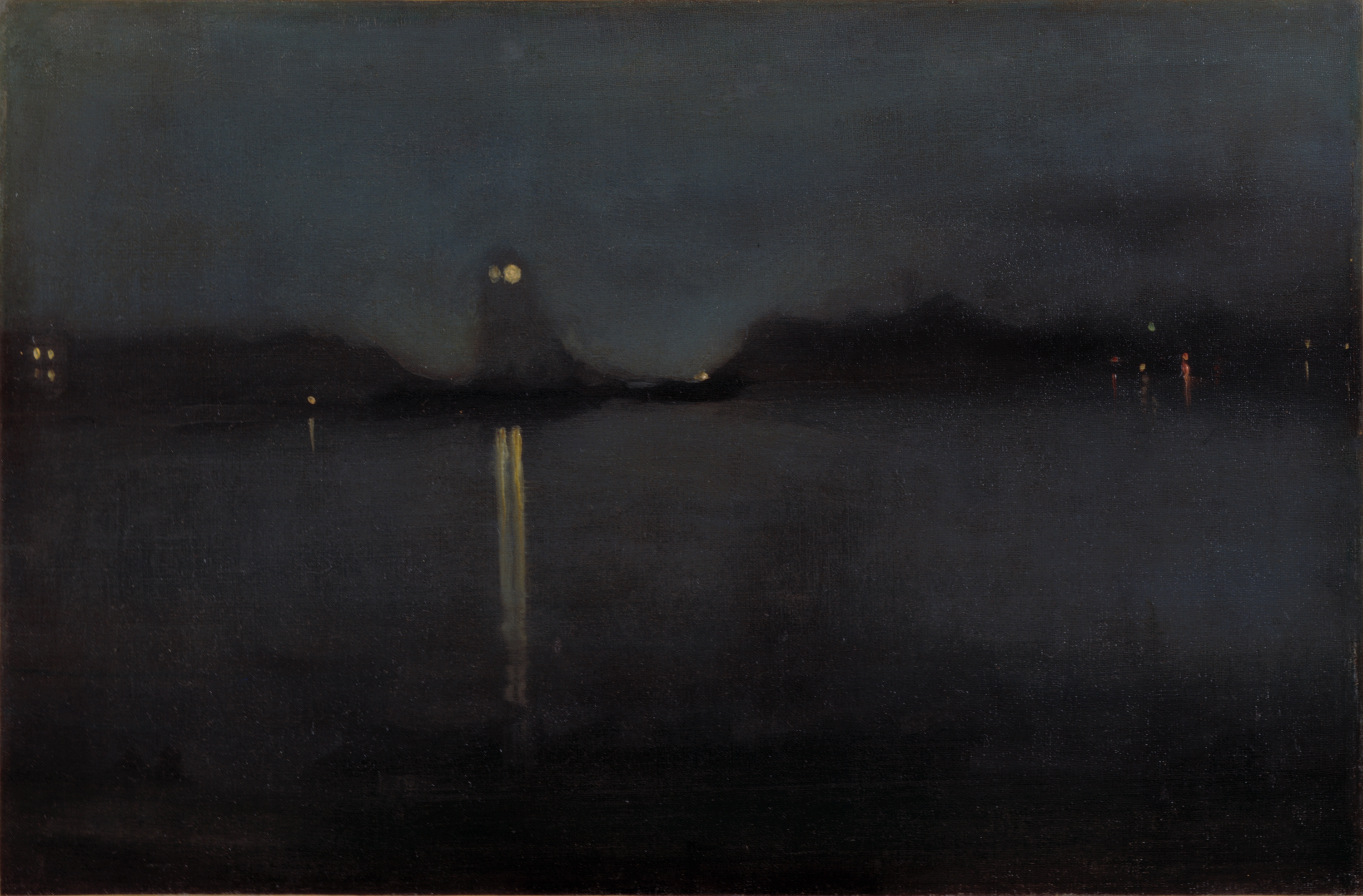
Nocturne by James Abbott McNeill Whistler, c. 1870−1877

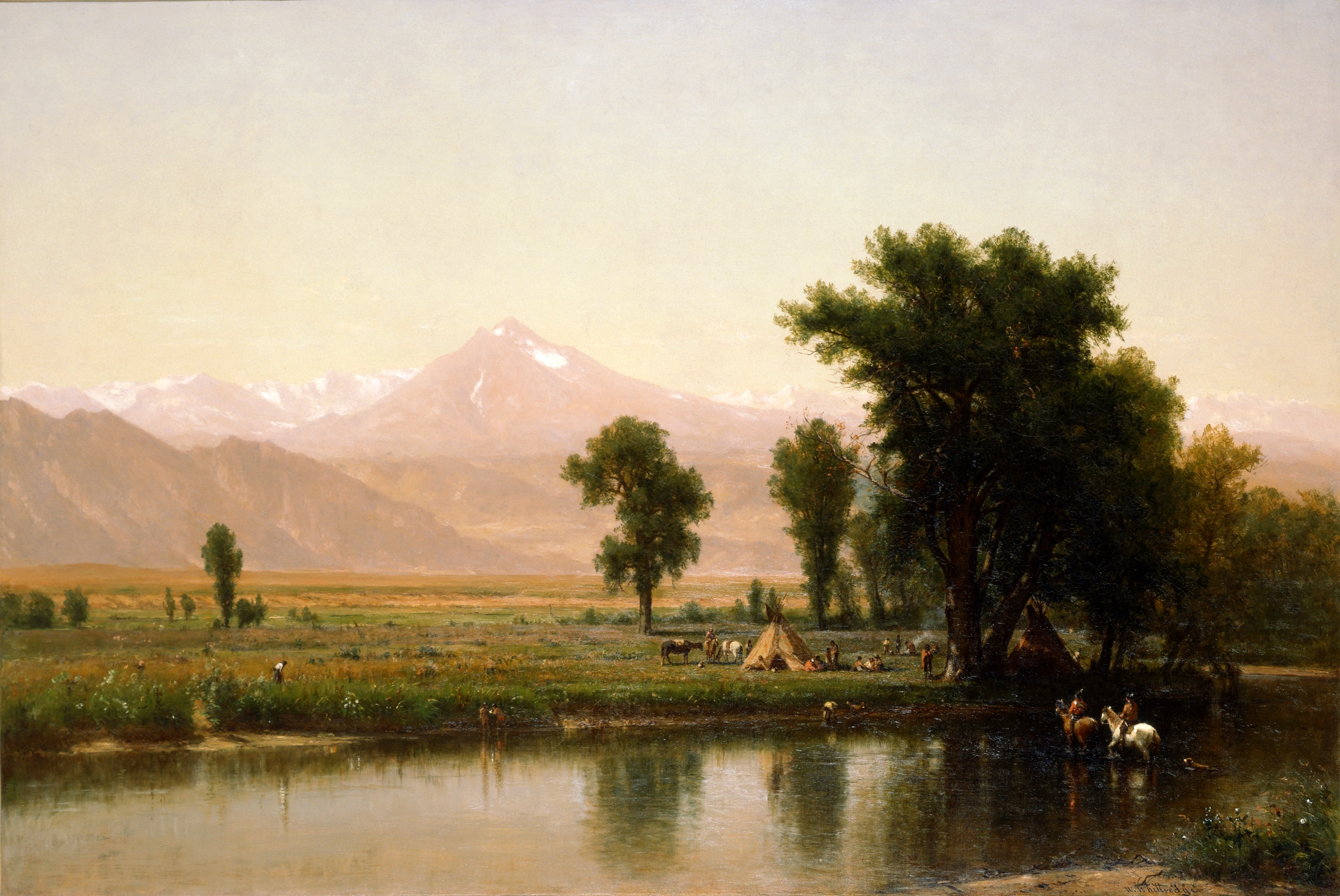
Crossing the River Platte by Worthington Whittredge, c. 1871

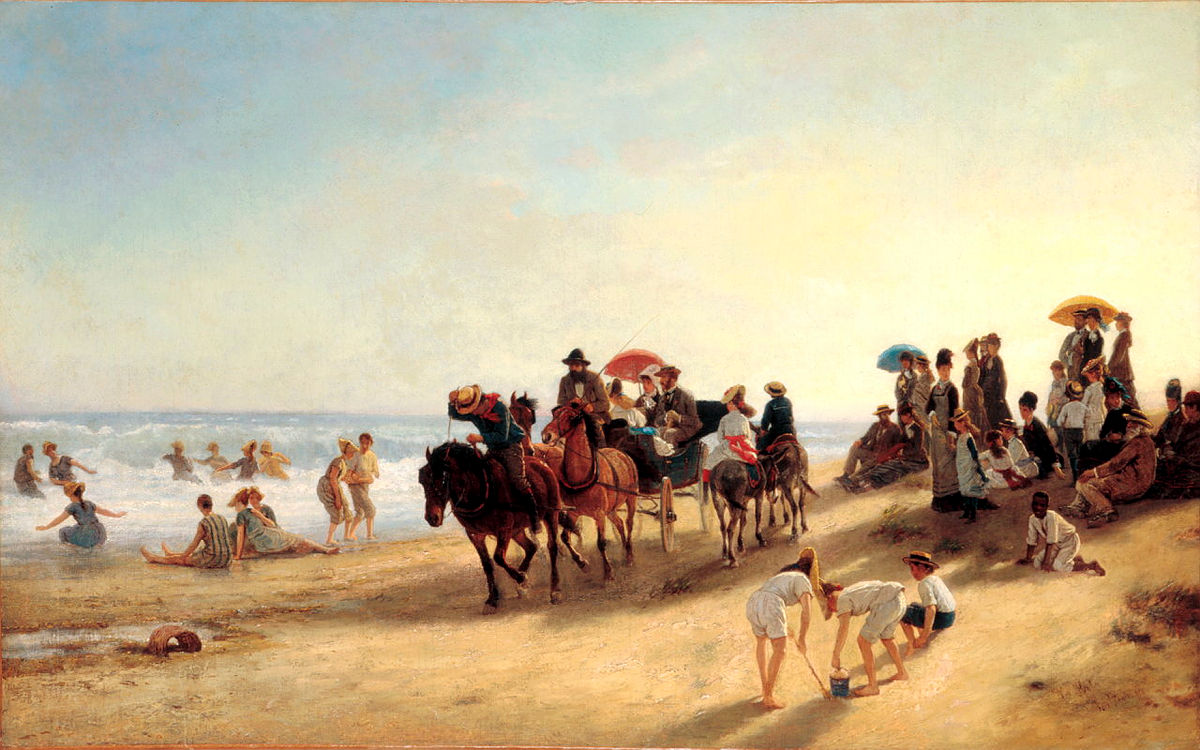
A Day at the Seashore by William Hahn, c. 1872-1878

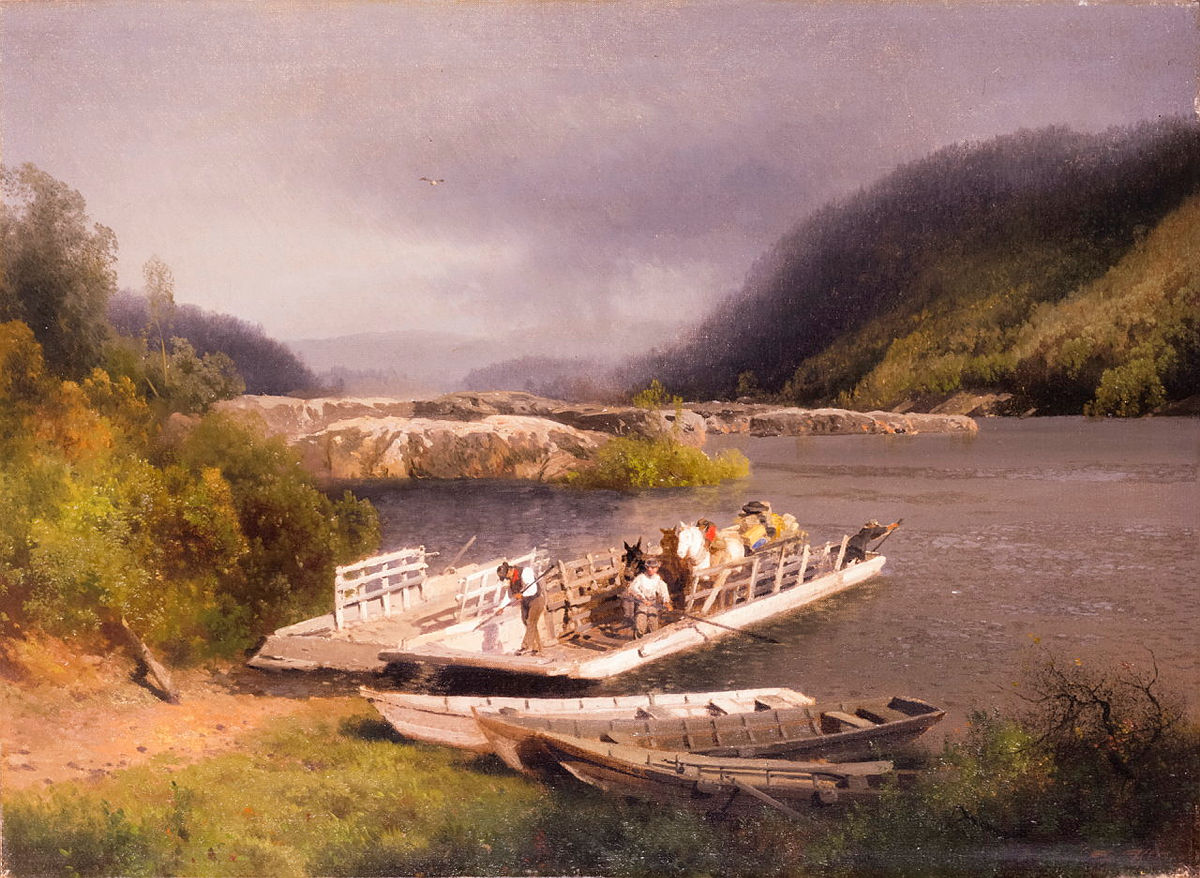
Old Ferryboat at McCall's Ferry by Herman Herzog, c. 1875-1880

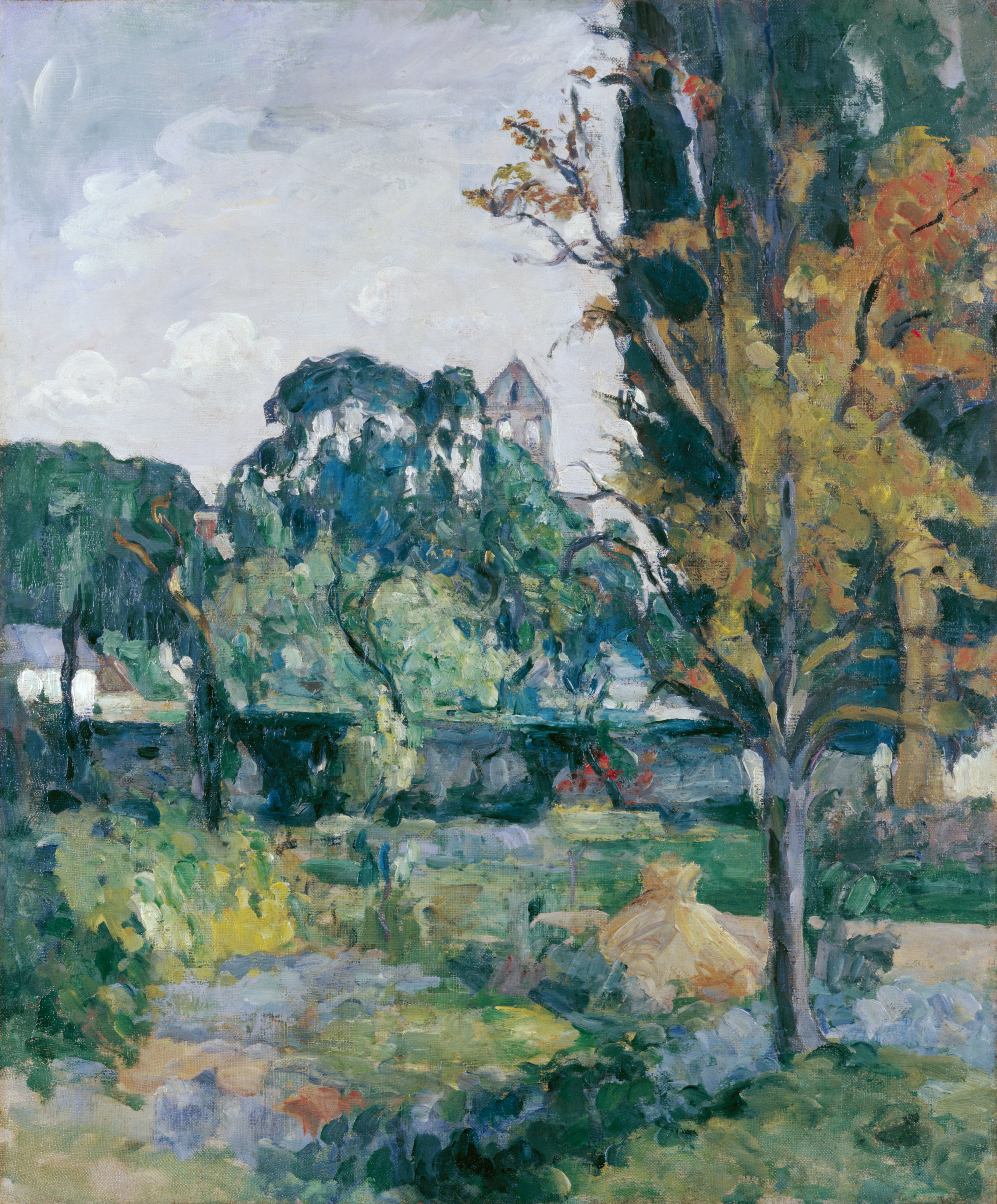
Paysage avec clocher (Landscape with Bell Tower) by Paul Cézanne, c. 1875 (Note: Upon the death of American art historian and art collector Charles Loeser in 1928, his will directed that the President of the United States would be able to choose eight of his Paul Cézanne "to adorn the White House".)

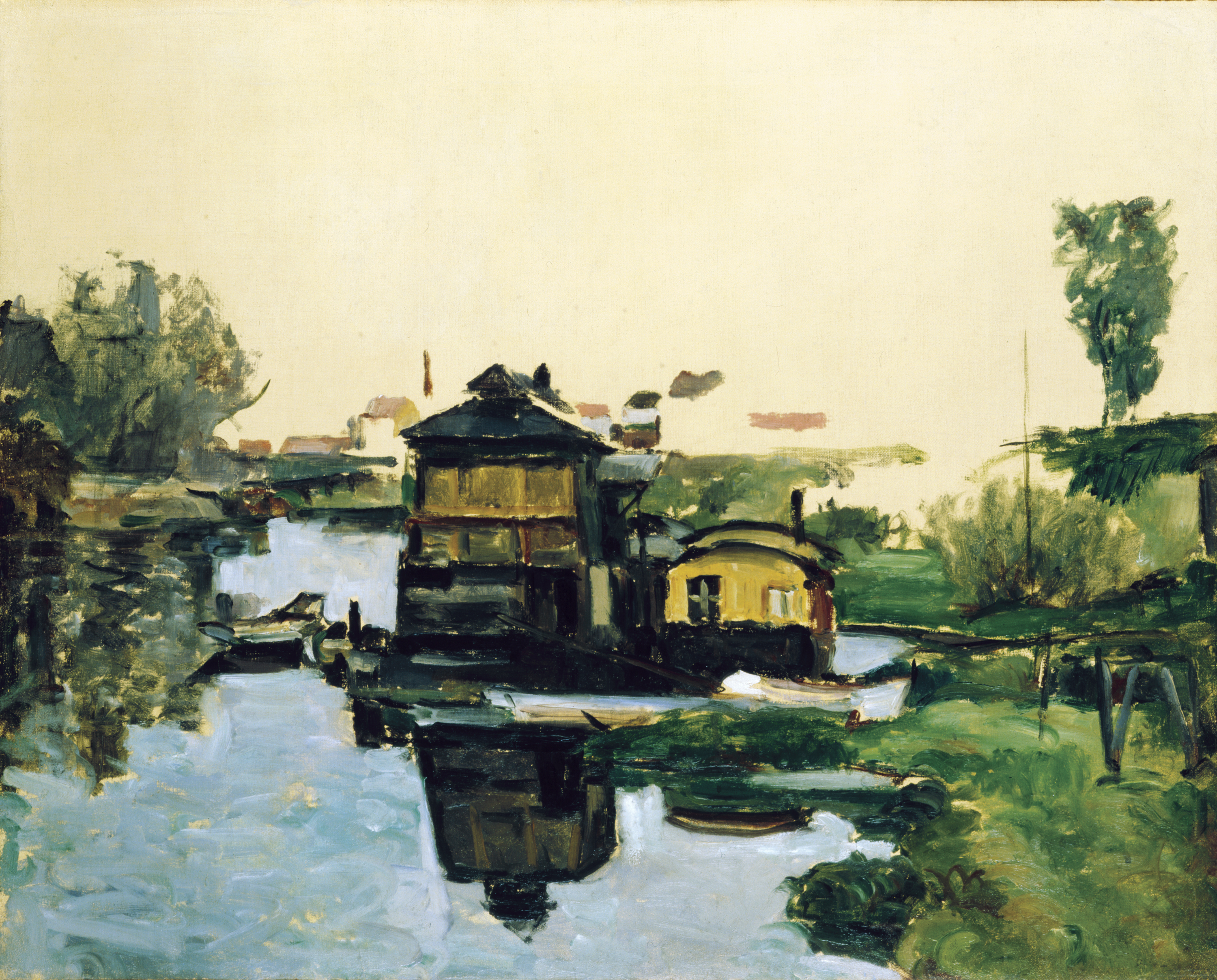
Maisons flottantes sur un fleuve (Houses Floating on a River) by Paul Cézanne, c. 1875-1877

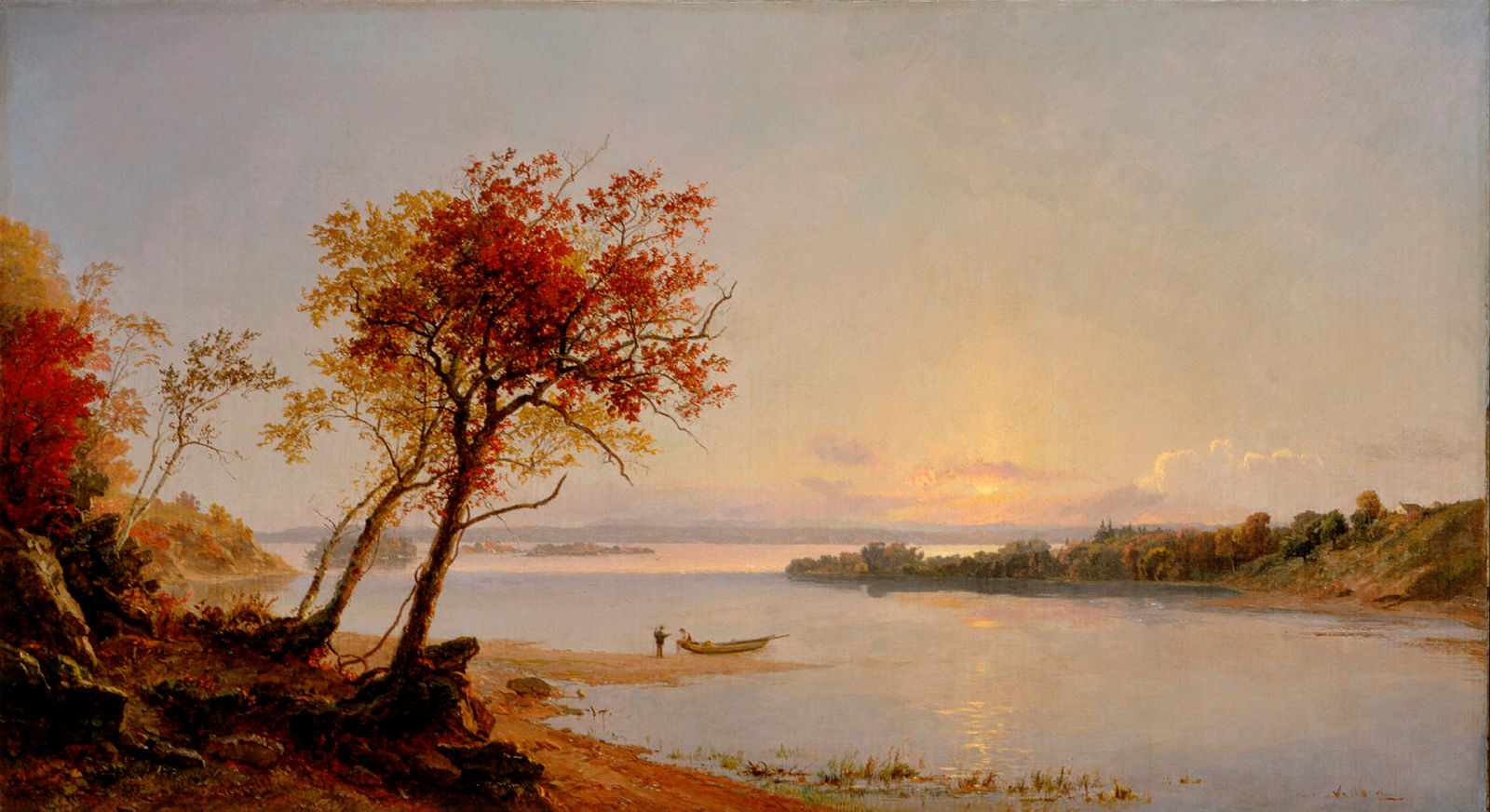
Autumn Landscape on the Hudson River by Jasper Francis Cropsey, 1876

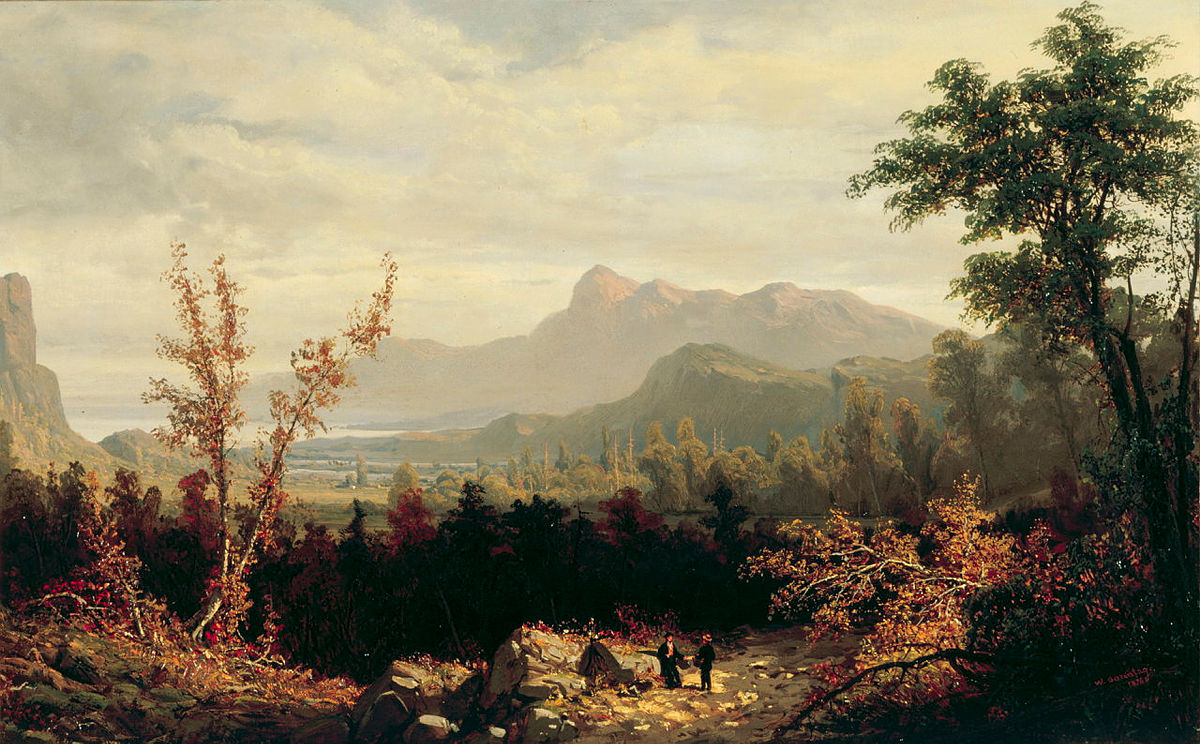
In the White Mountains, New Hampshire by William Louis Sonntag, 1876

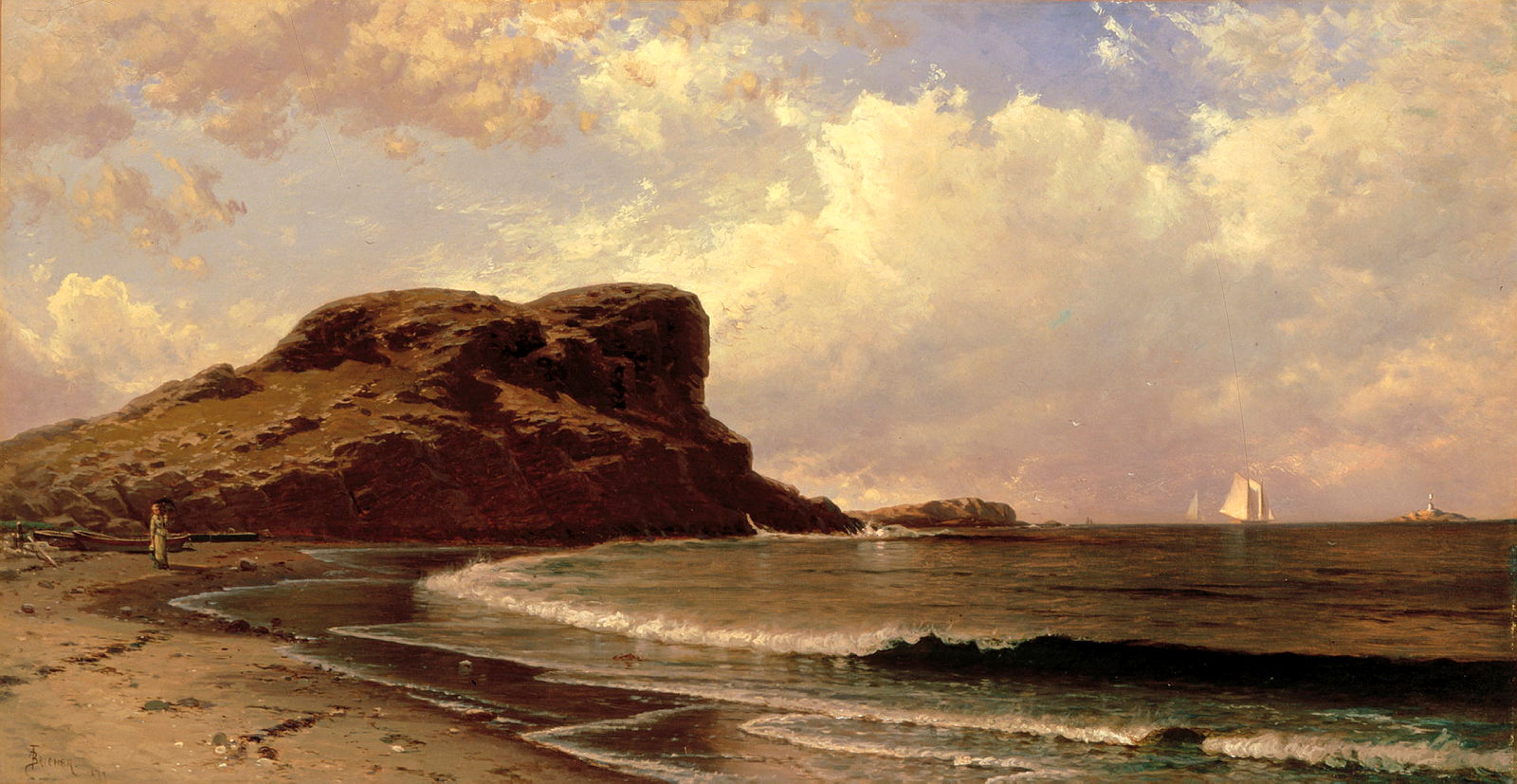
Castle Rock, Nahant, Massachusetts by Alfred Thompson Bricher, 1877

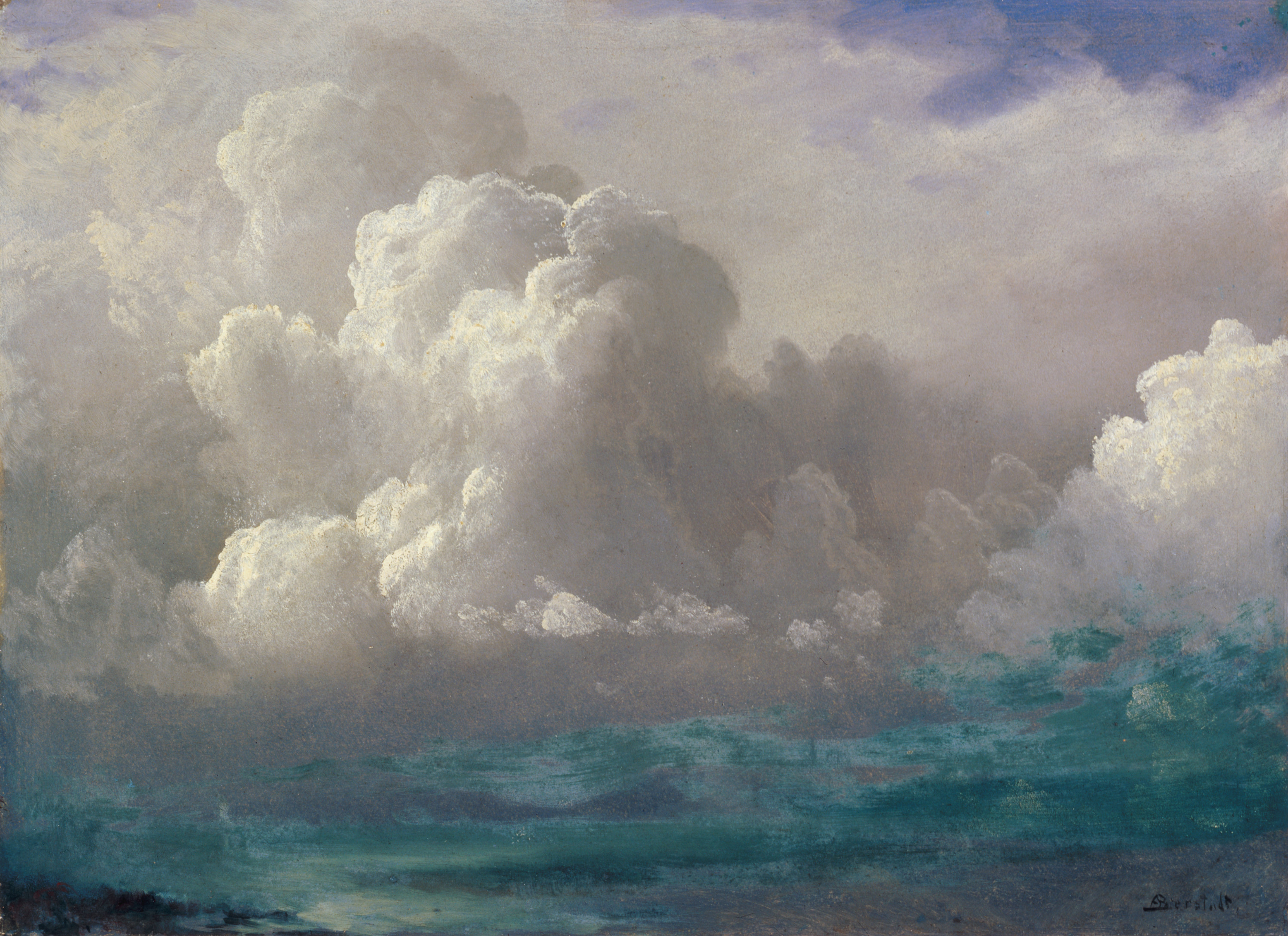
Storm Clouds by Albert Bierstadt, c. 1880

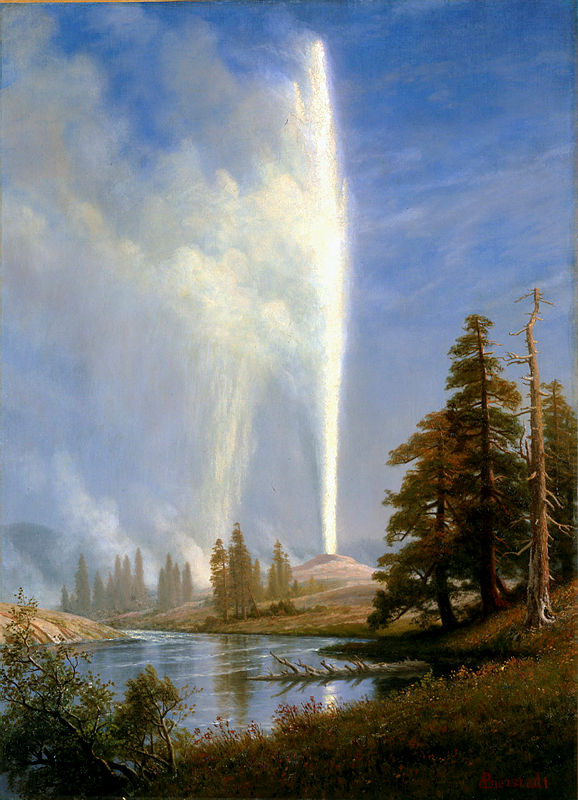
Old Faithful by Albert Bierstadt, c. 1881

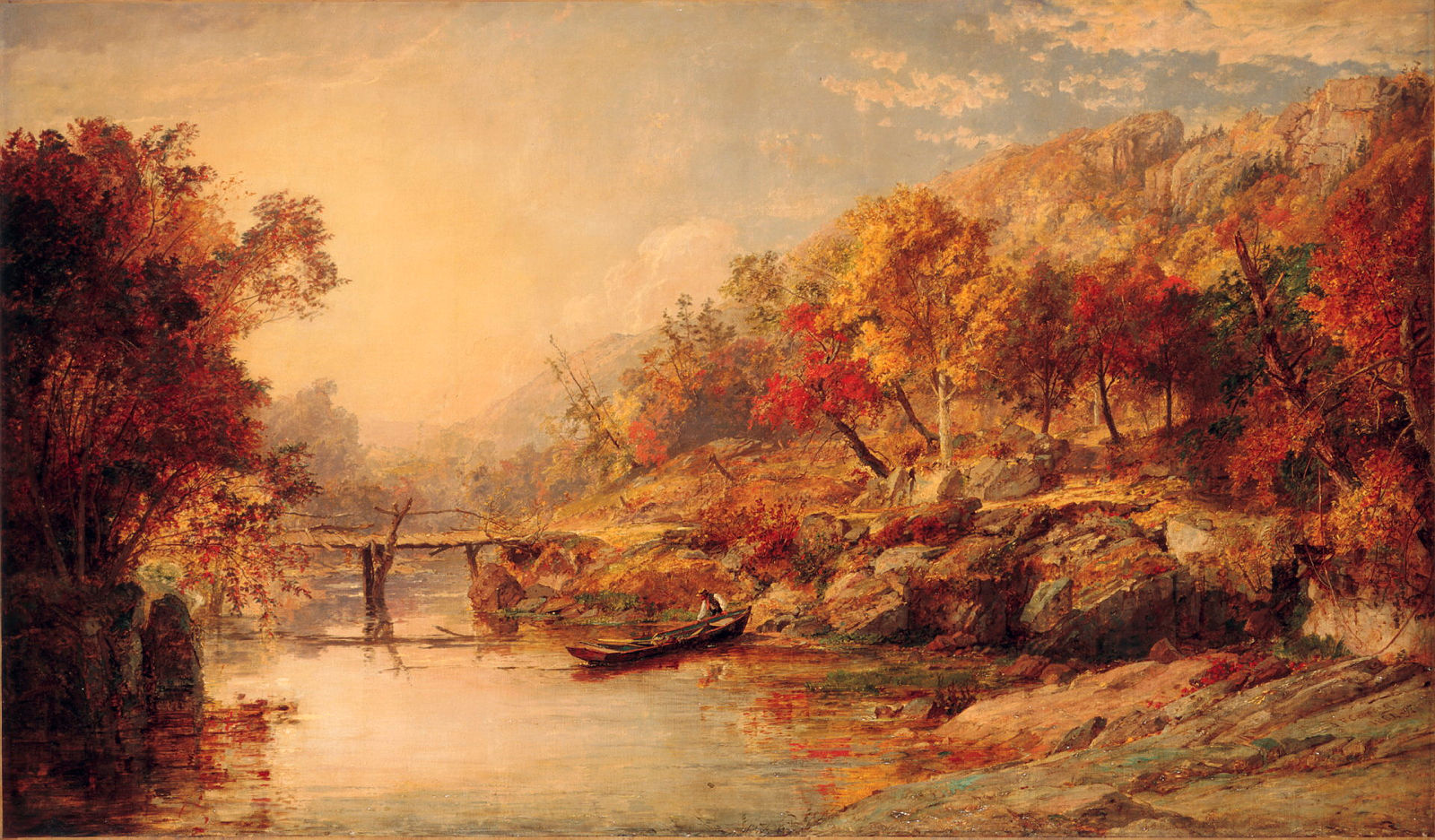
The Mellow Autumn Time by Jasper Francis Cropsey, c. 1884-1897

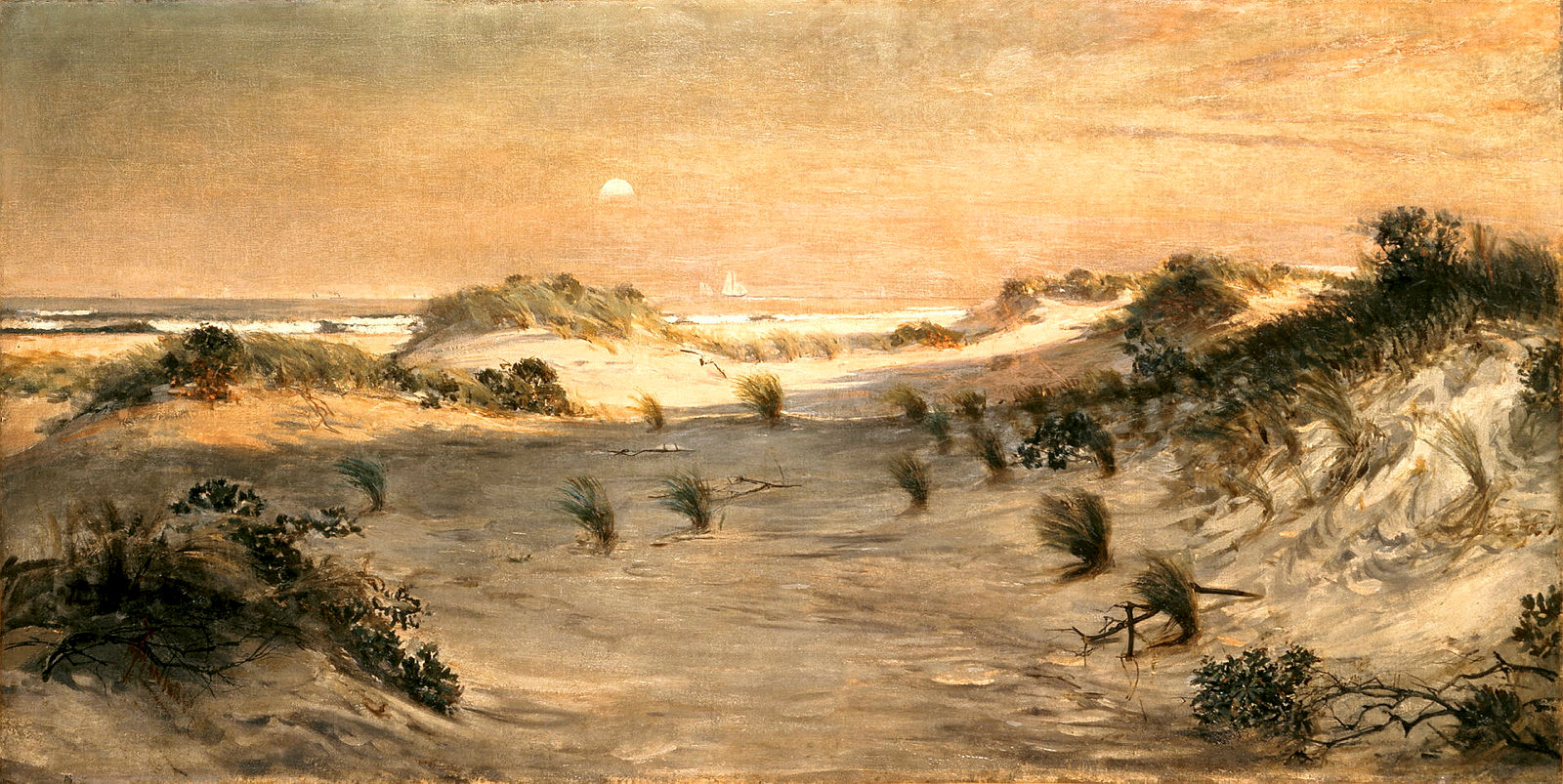
Sand Dunes at Sunset, Atlantic City by Henry Ossawa Tanner, c. 1885

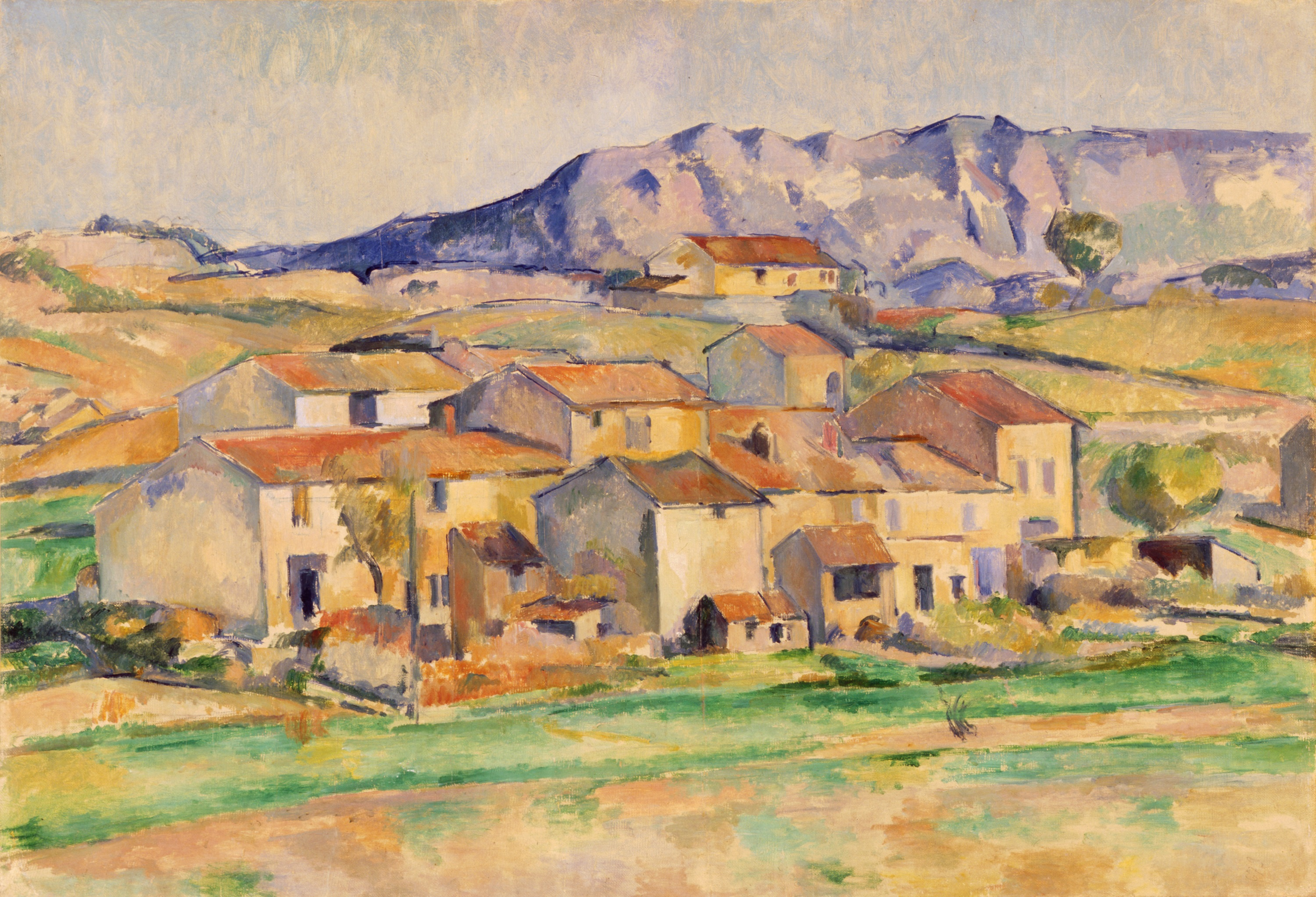
Hameau à Payennet près de Gardanne (Hamlet at Payennet, near Gardanne) by Paul Cézanne, c. 1886-1890

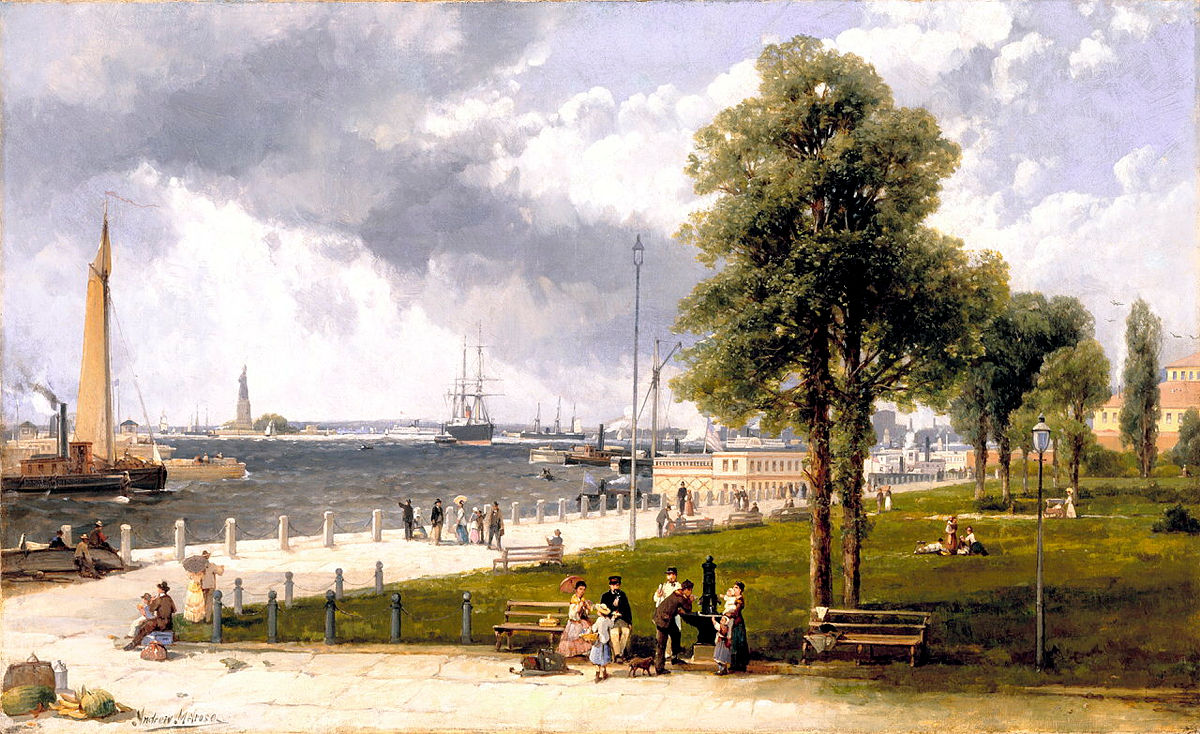
New York Harbor and Battery by Andrew Melrose, c. 1887

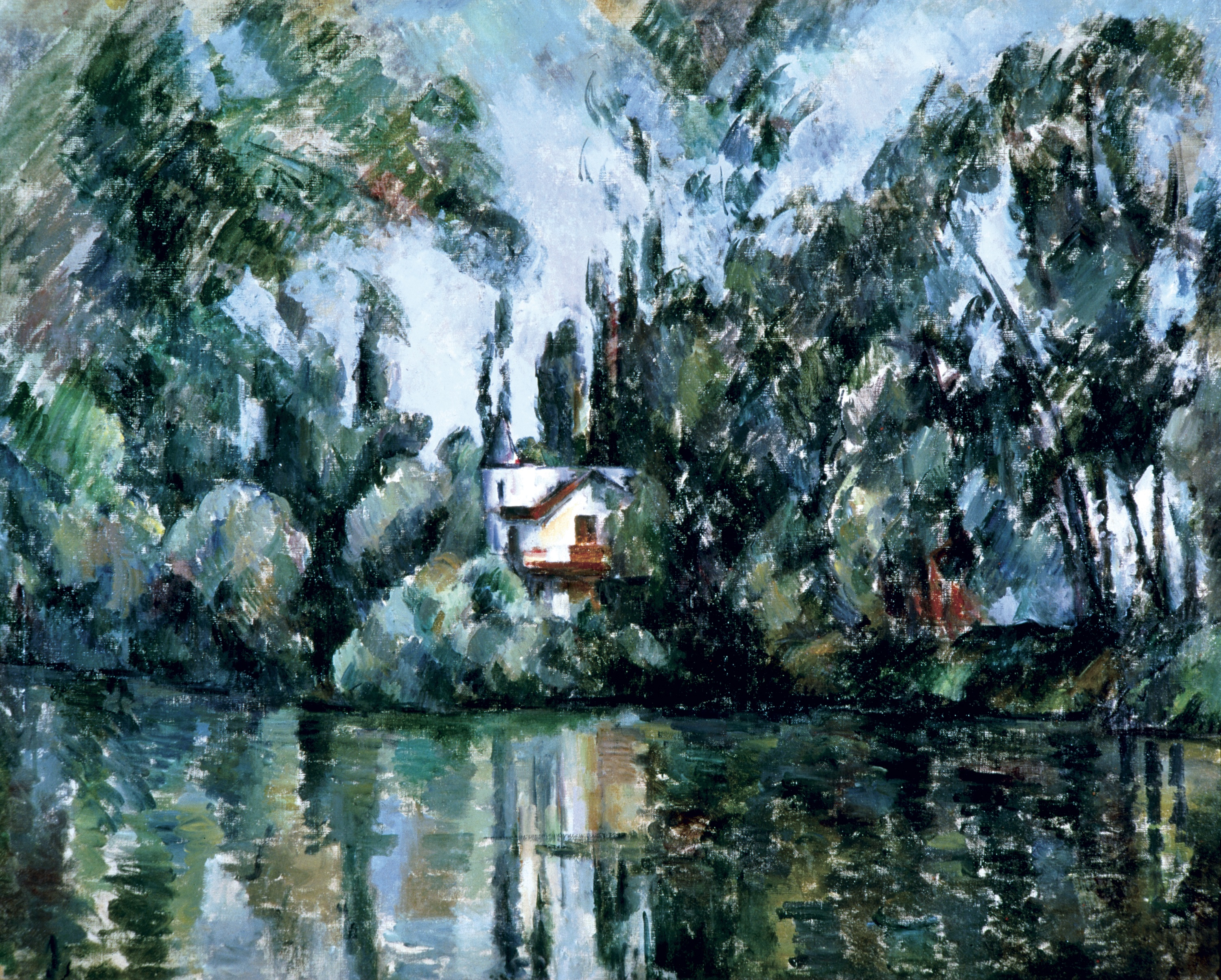
Maison au bord de la Marne (House on the Marne) by Paul Cézanne, c. 1888-1894

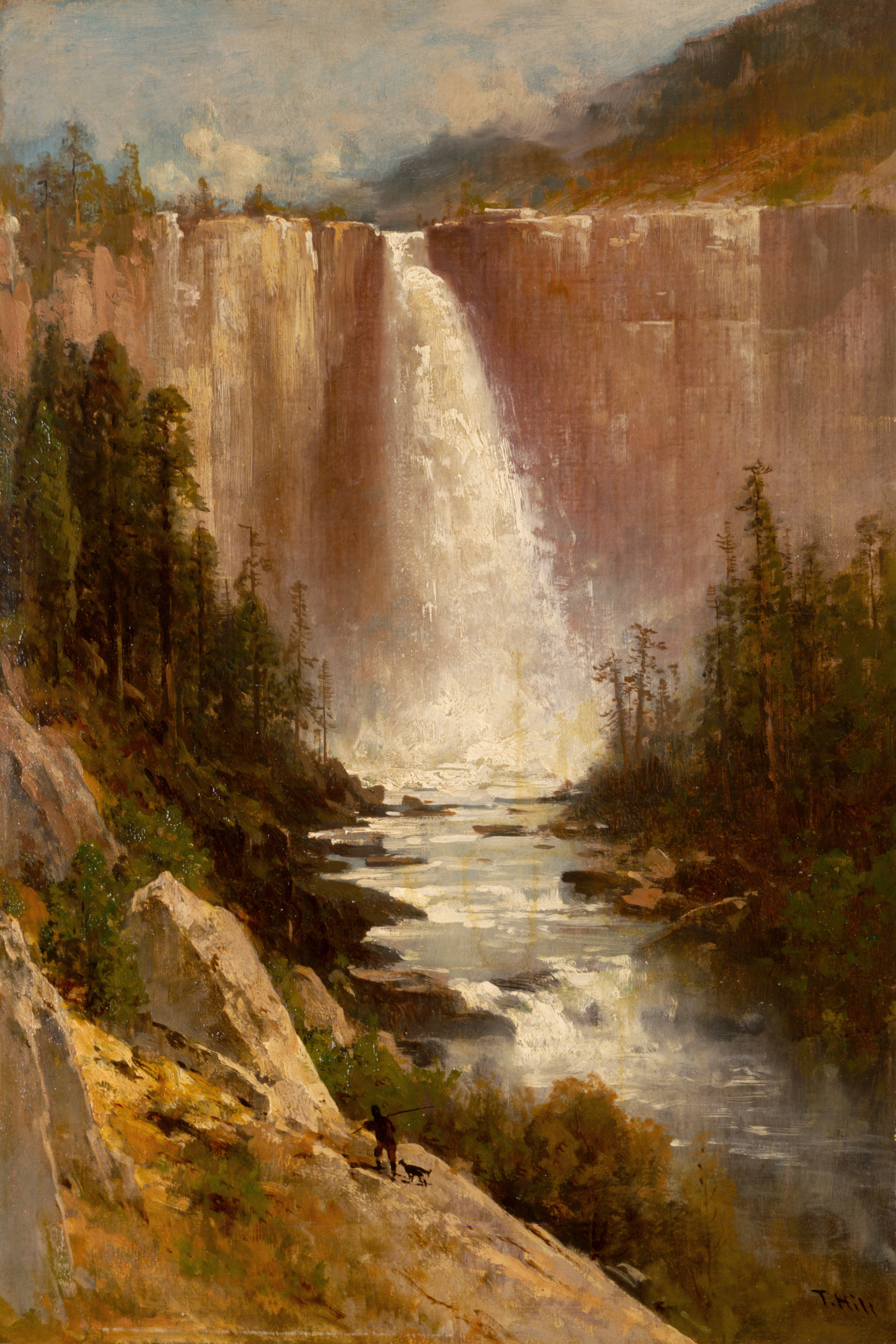
Nevada Falls, Yosemite by Thomas Hill, 1889

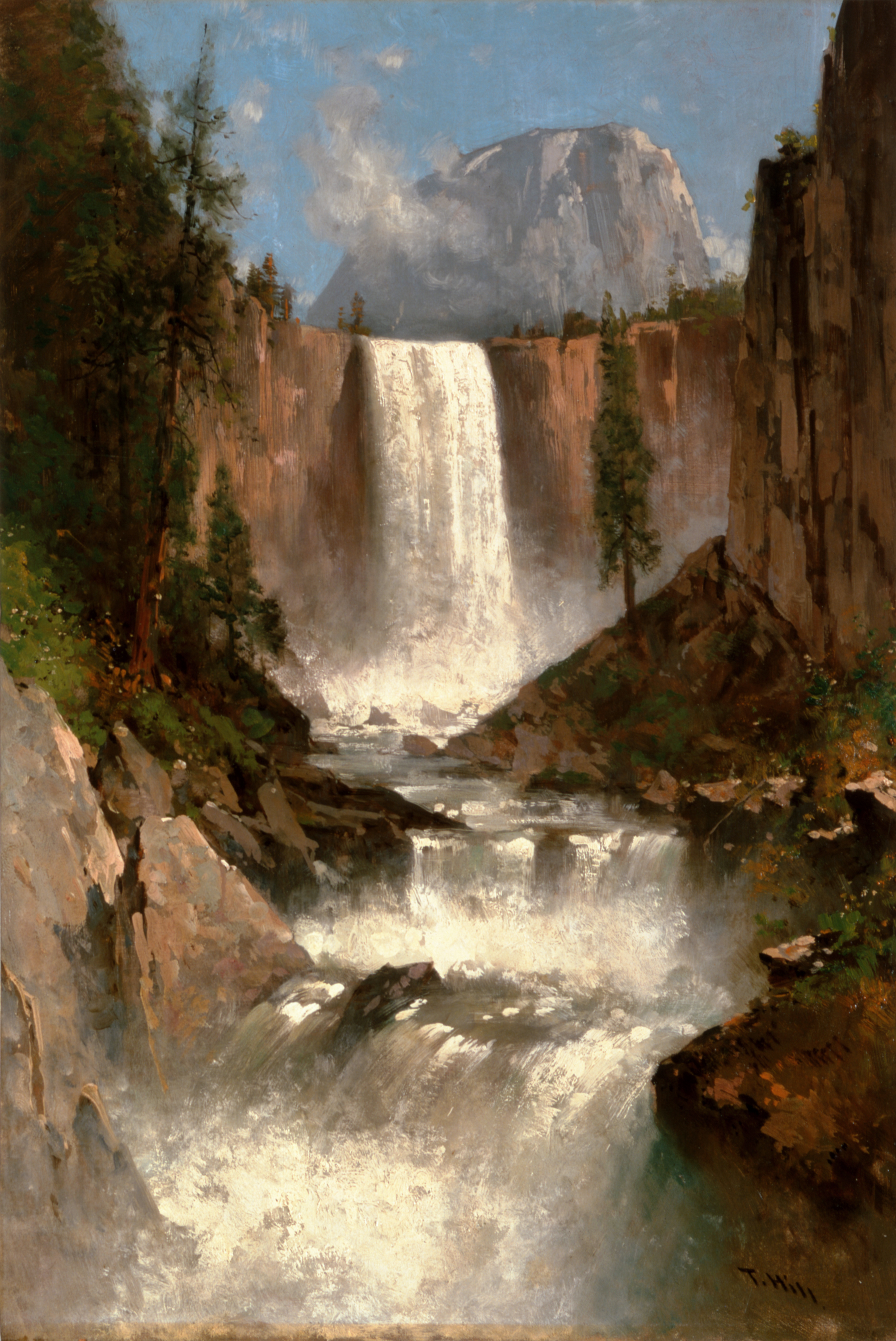
Vernal Falls, Yosemite by Thomas Hill, 1889

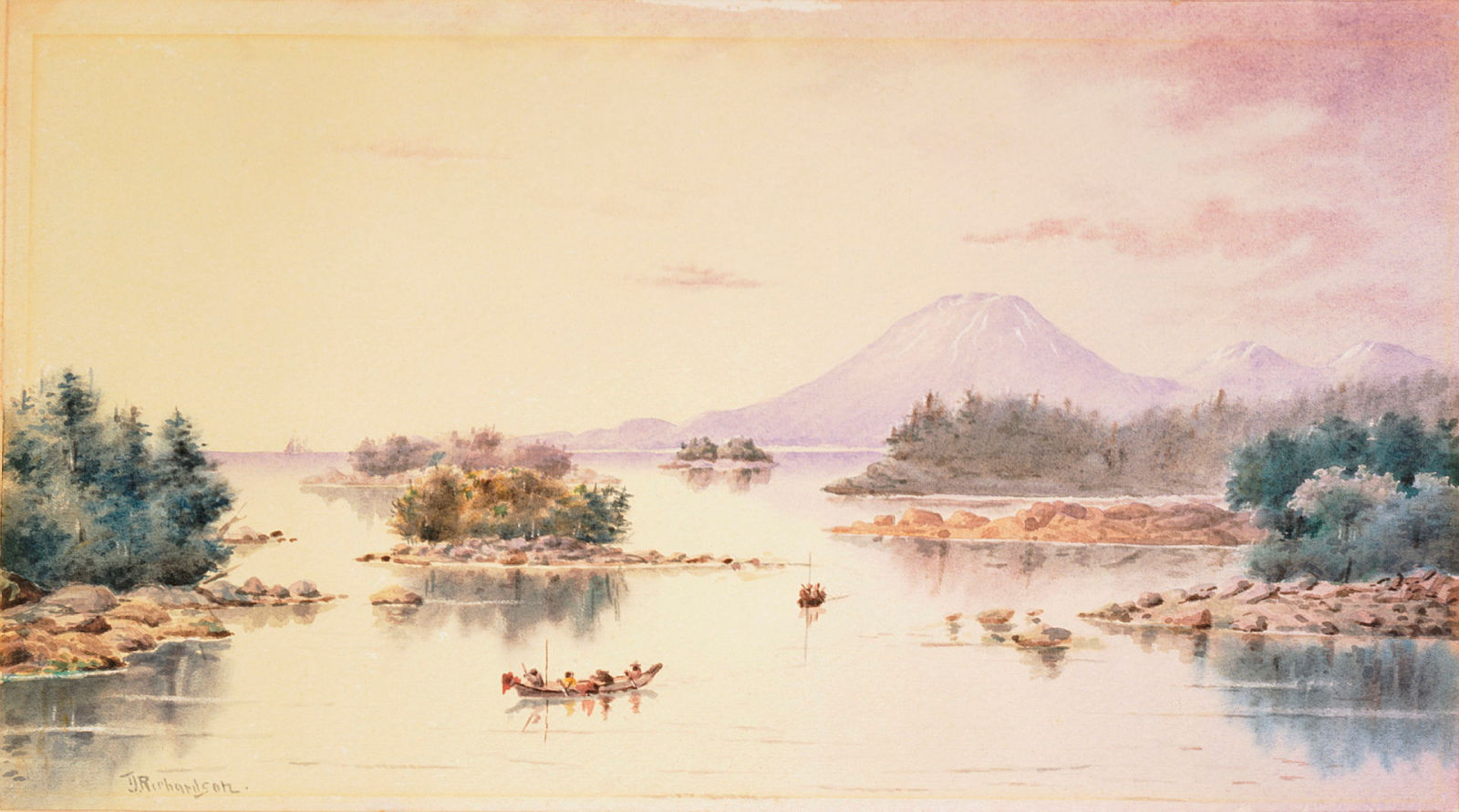
Sitka Bay, Alaska by Theodore J. Richardson, 1889

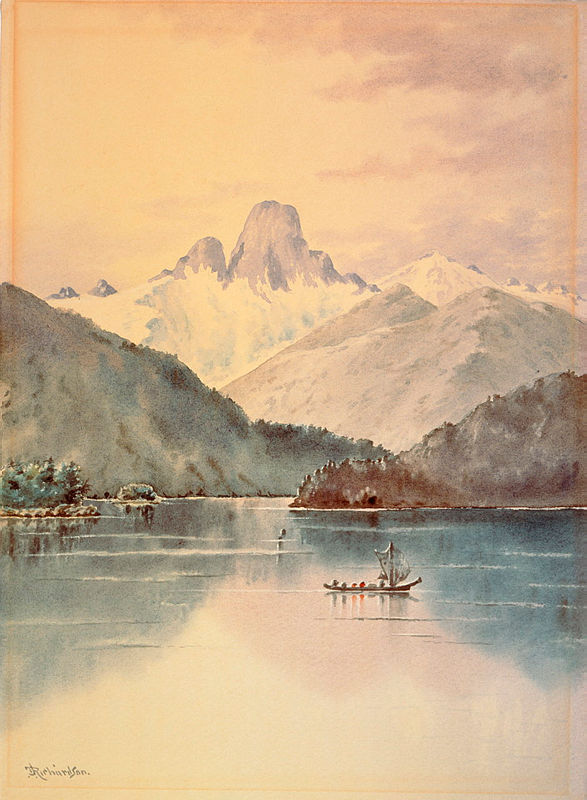
Alaskan Landscape by Theodore J. Richardson, 1889

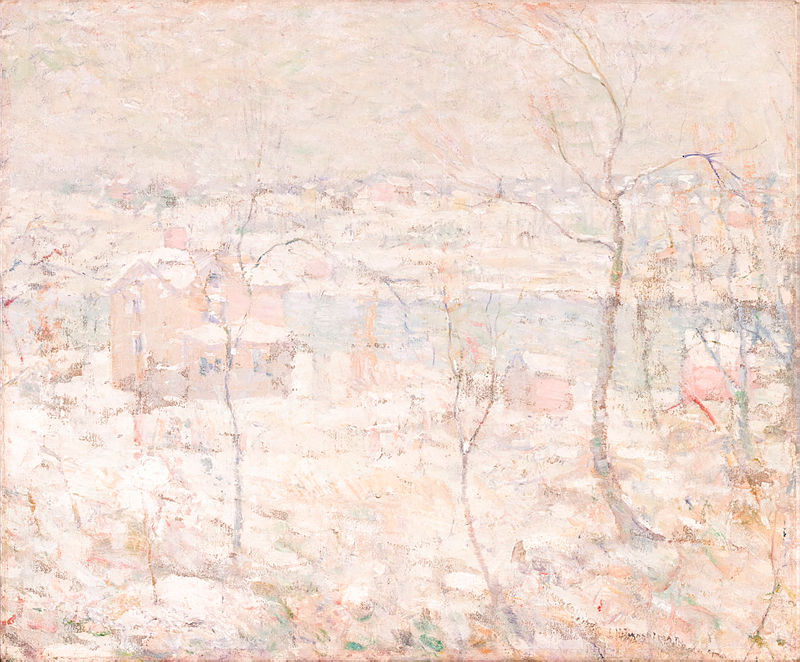
Landscape with Houses by Unknown, c. 1890

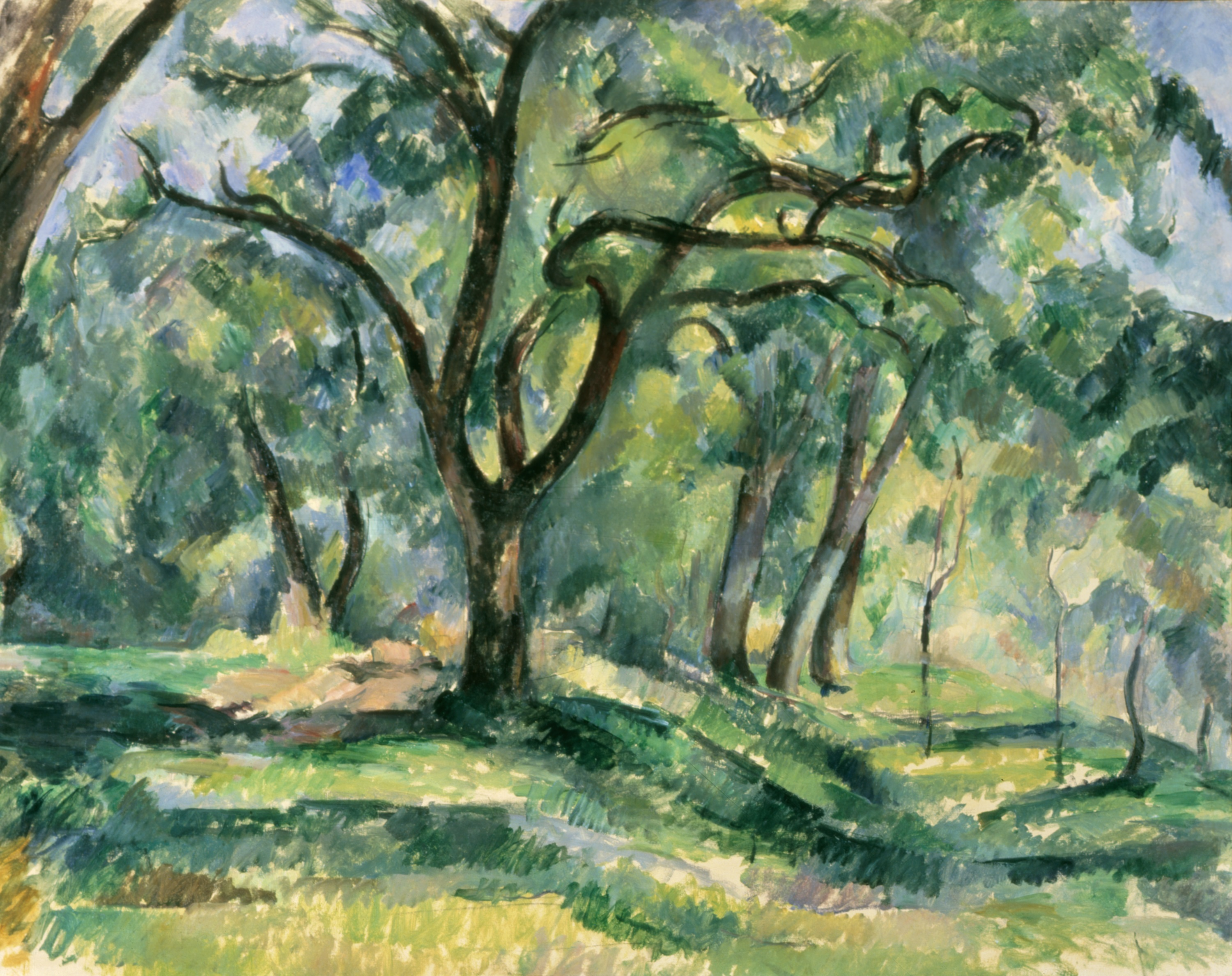
Sous-bois (Underwood) by Paul Cézanne, c. 1890-1892

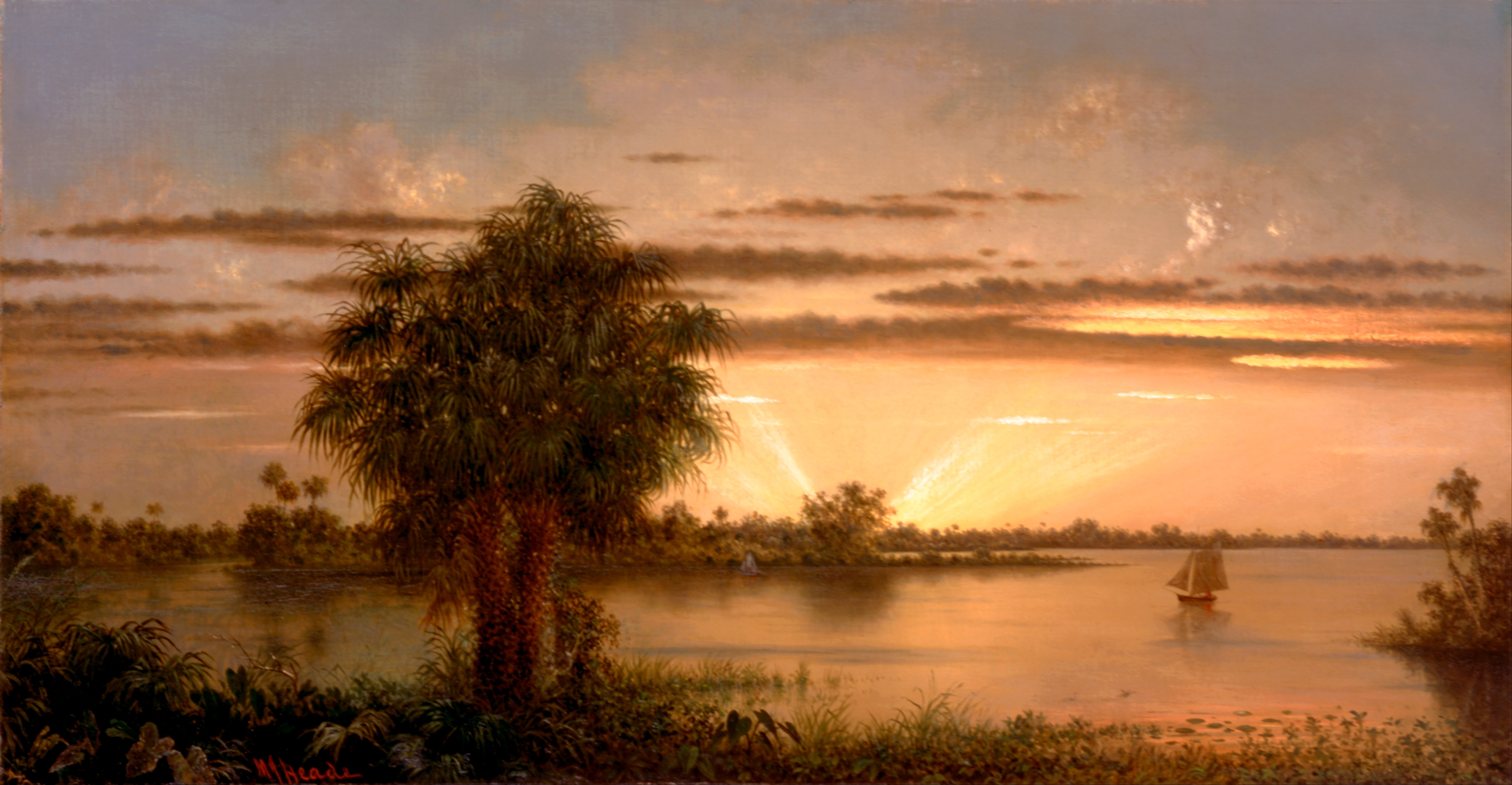
Florida Sunrise by Martin Johnson Heade, c. 1890-1895

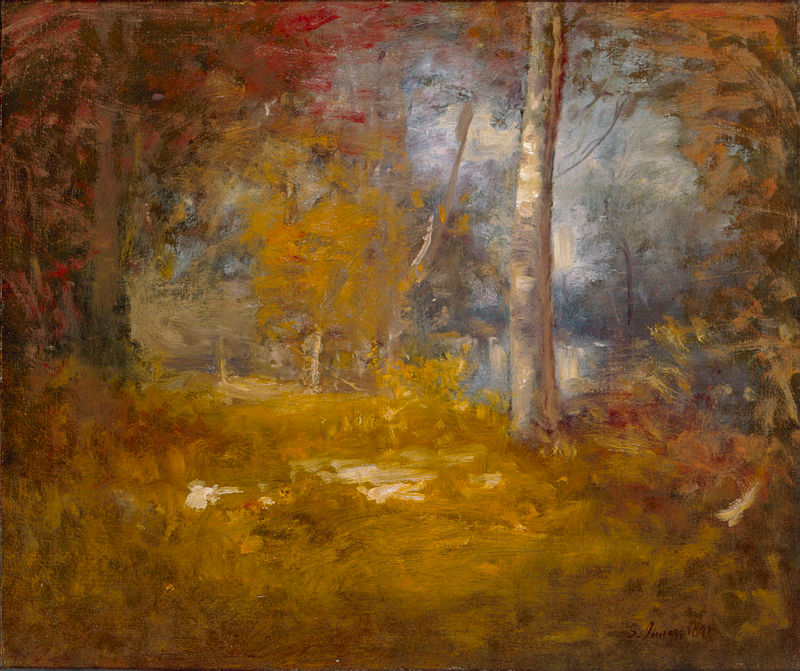
Woodland Pool by George Inness, 1891

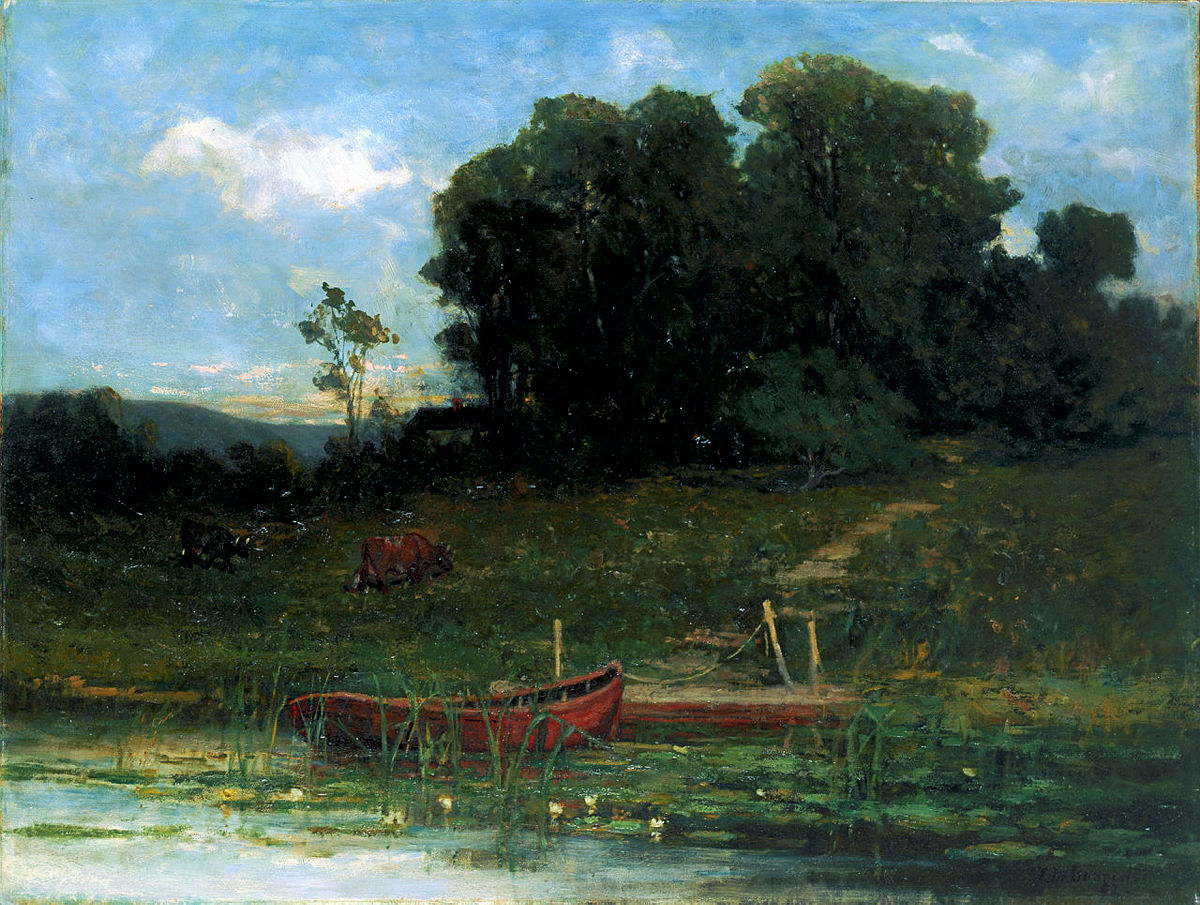
The Farm Landing by Edward Mitchell Bannister, 1892

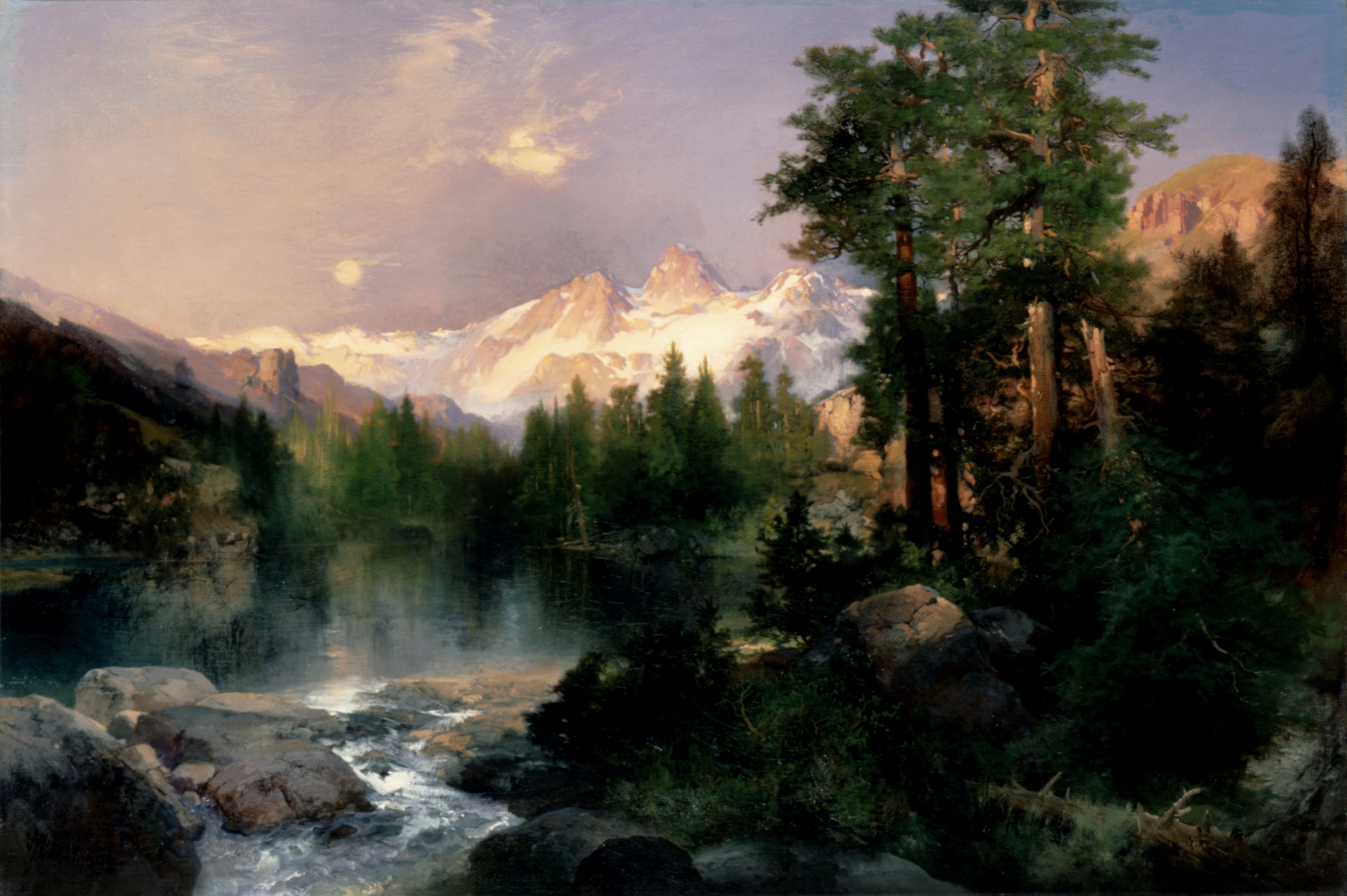
The Three Tetons by Thomas Moran, 1895

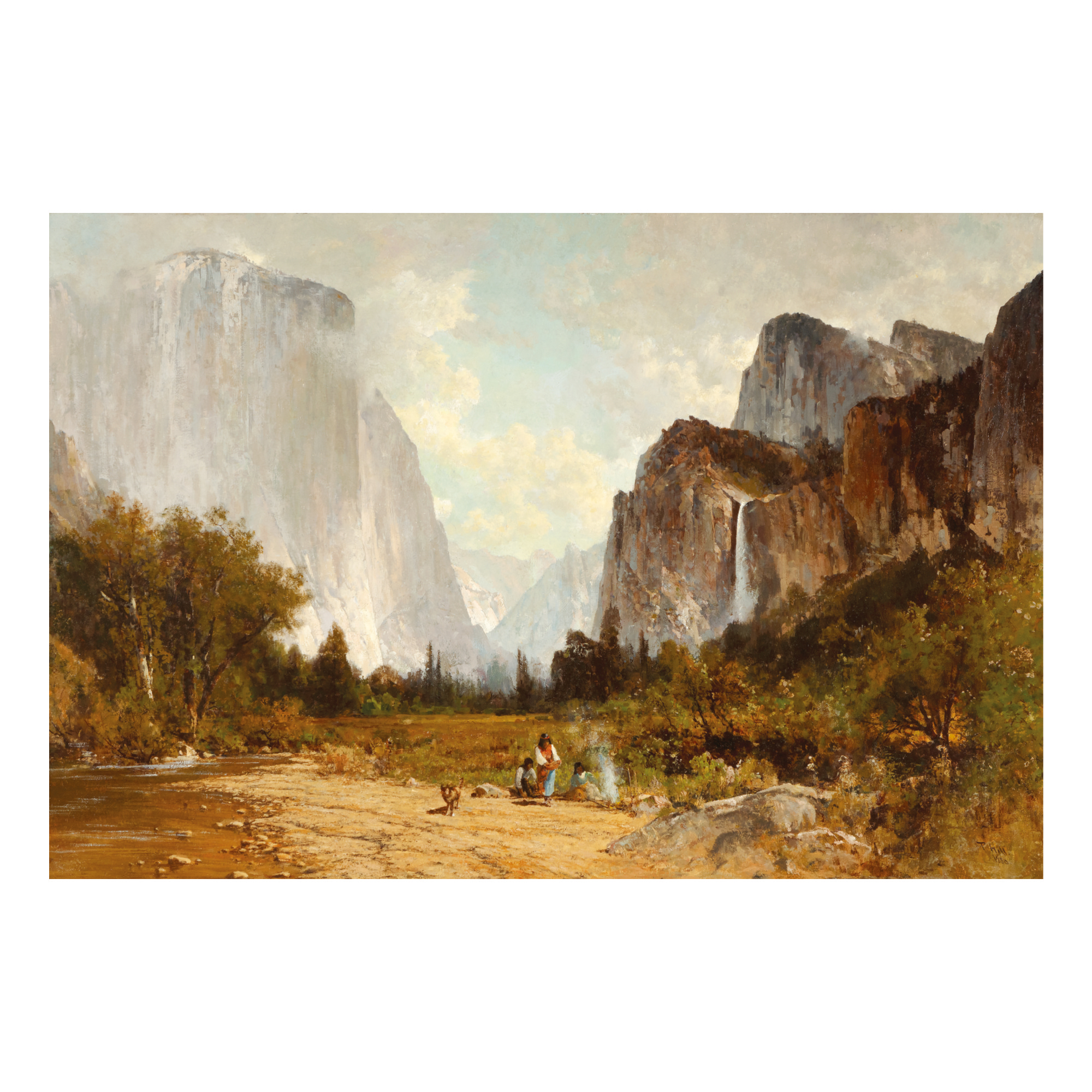
Yosemite, Bridal Veil Falls by Thomas Hill, 1895

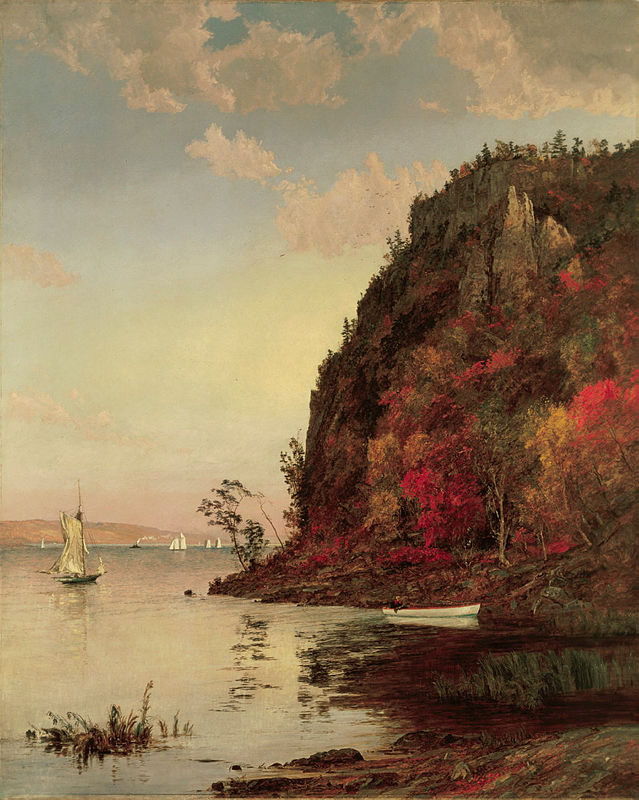
Under the Palisades, in October by Jasper Francis Cropsey, 1895

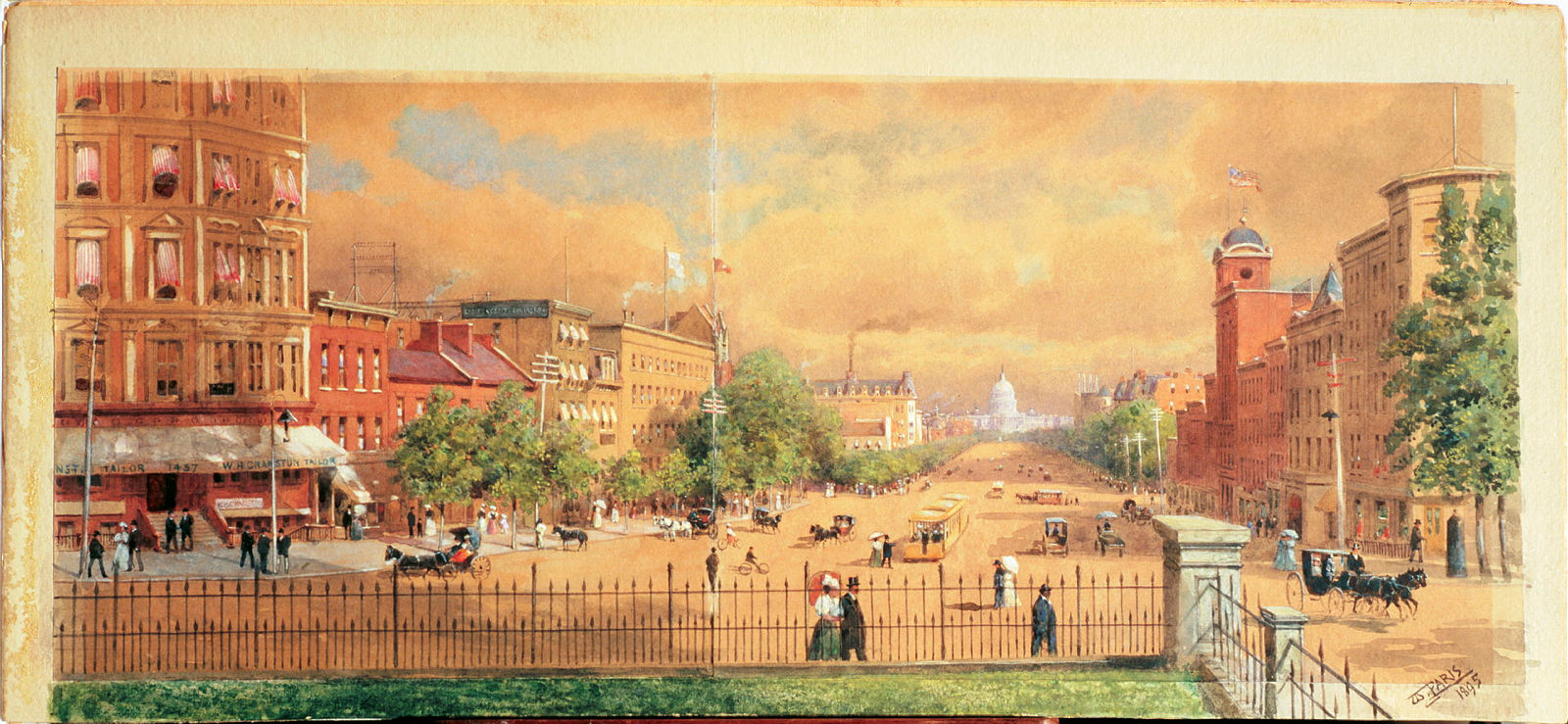
View of Pennsylvania Avenue From the Treasury Building Looking Toward the Capitol by Walter Paris, 1895

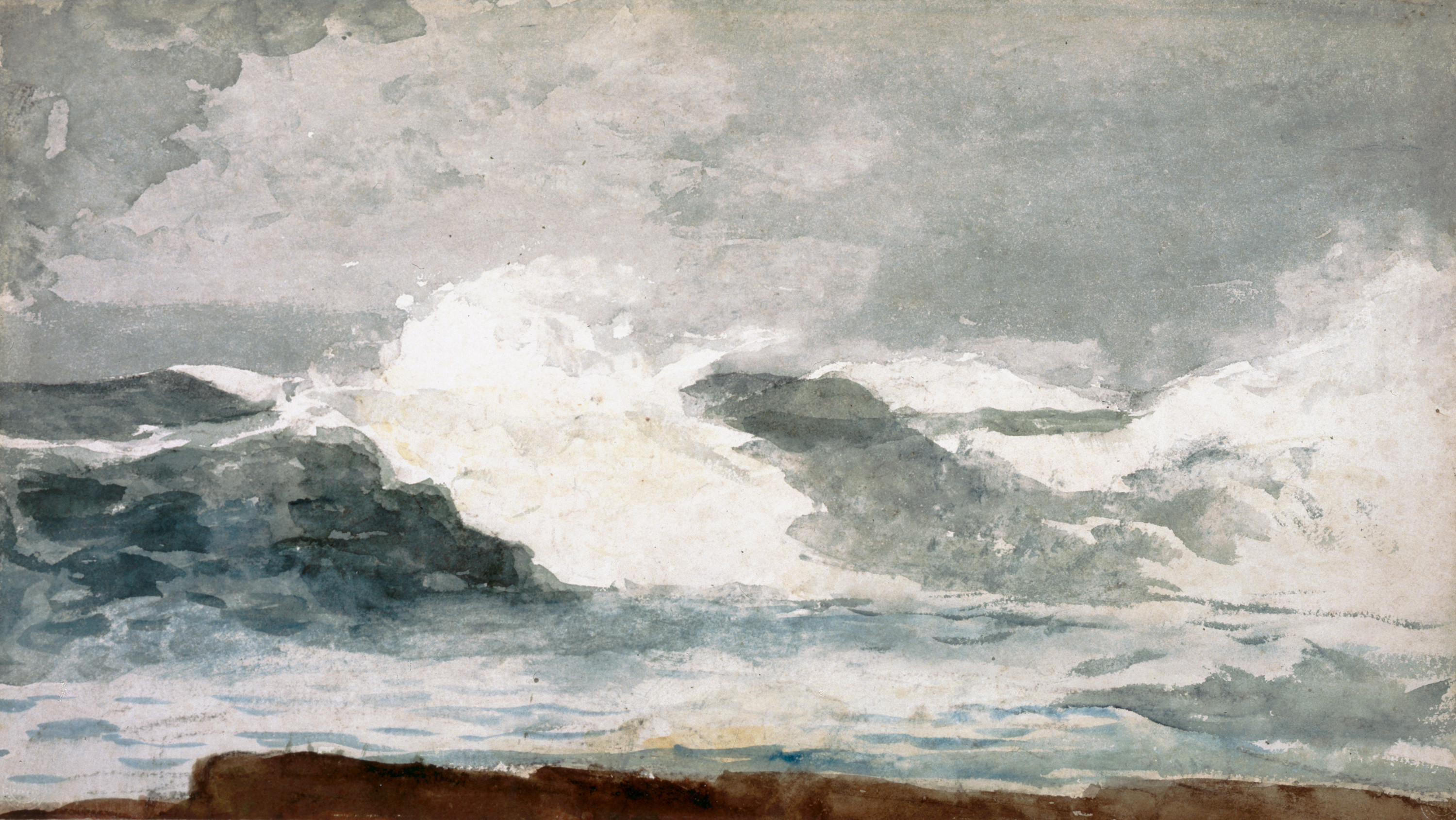
Surf at Prout's Neck by Winslow Homer, c. 1895

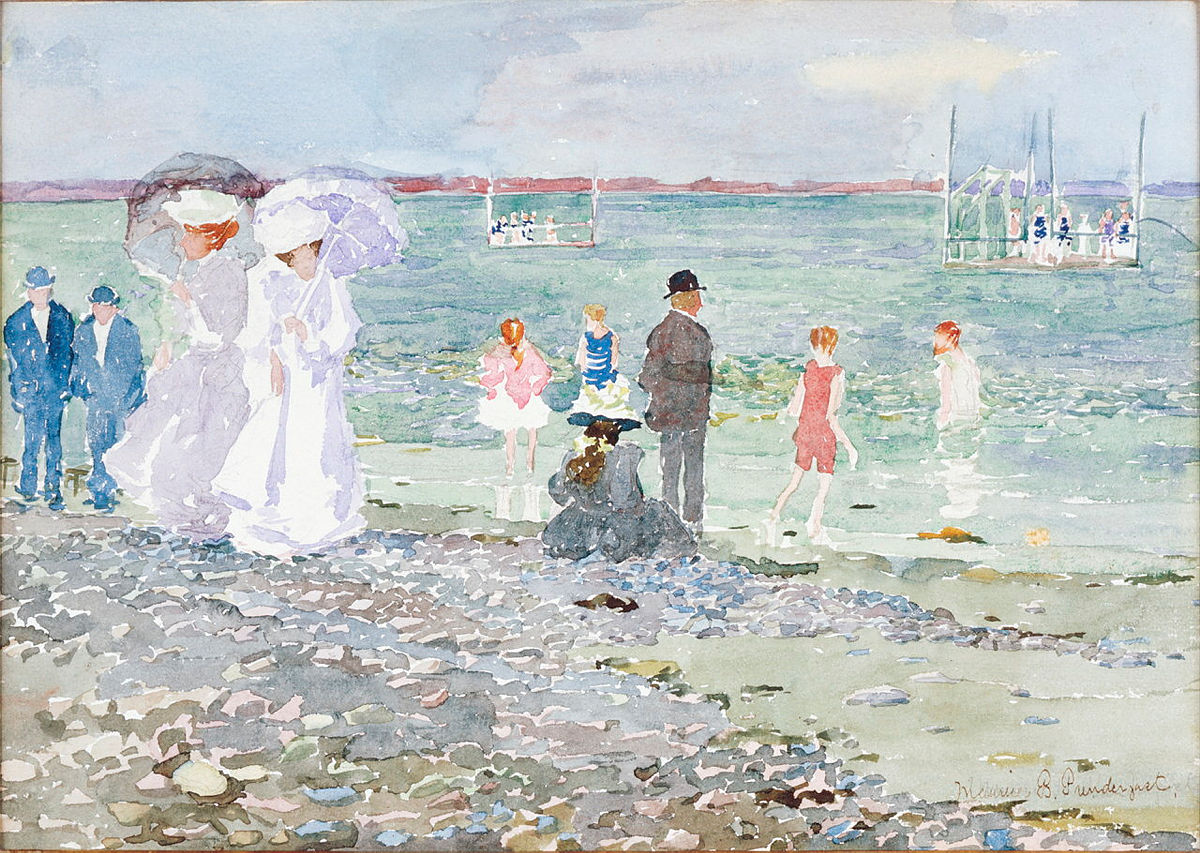
Revere Beach by Maurice Prendergast, c. 1896-1897

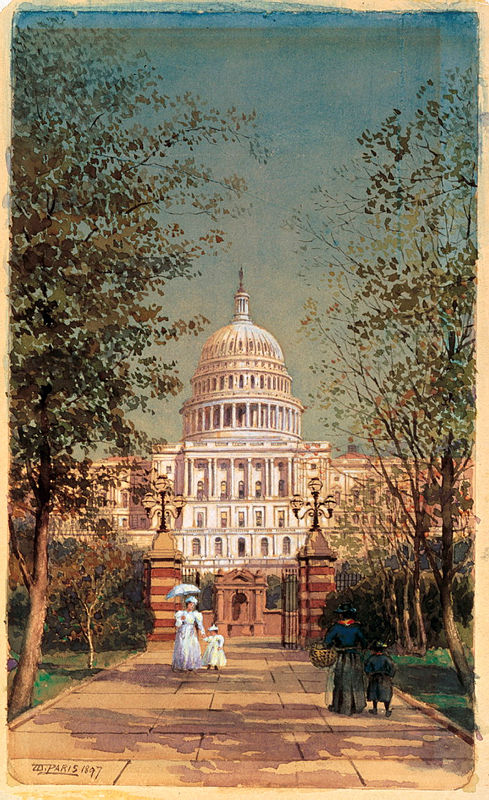
A Stroll by the Capitol by Walter Paris, 1897

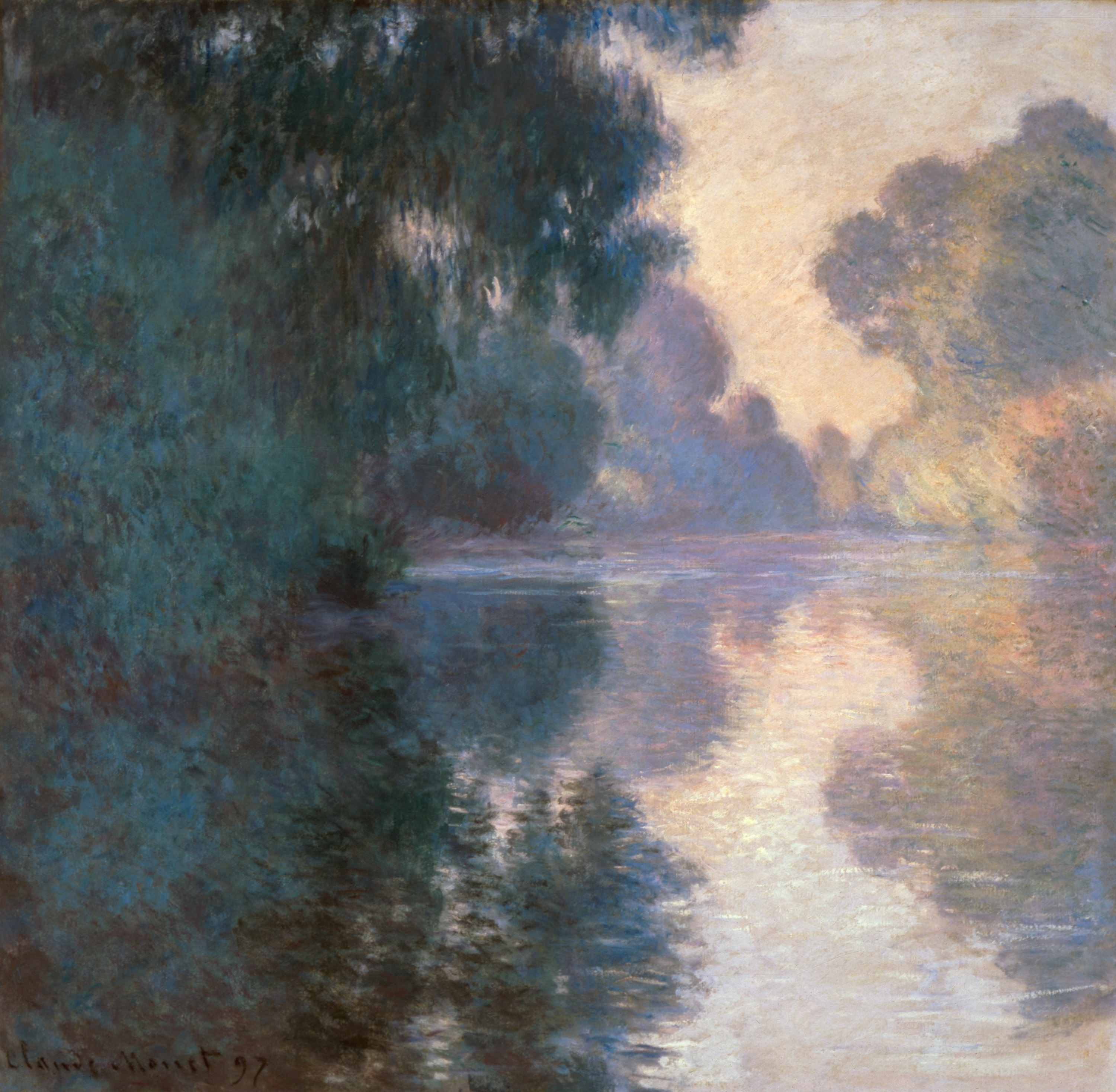
Matinée sur la Seine, le beau temps (Morning on the Seine, good weather) by Claude Monet, 1897

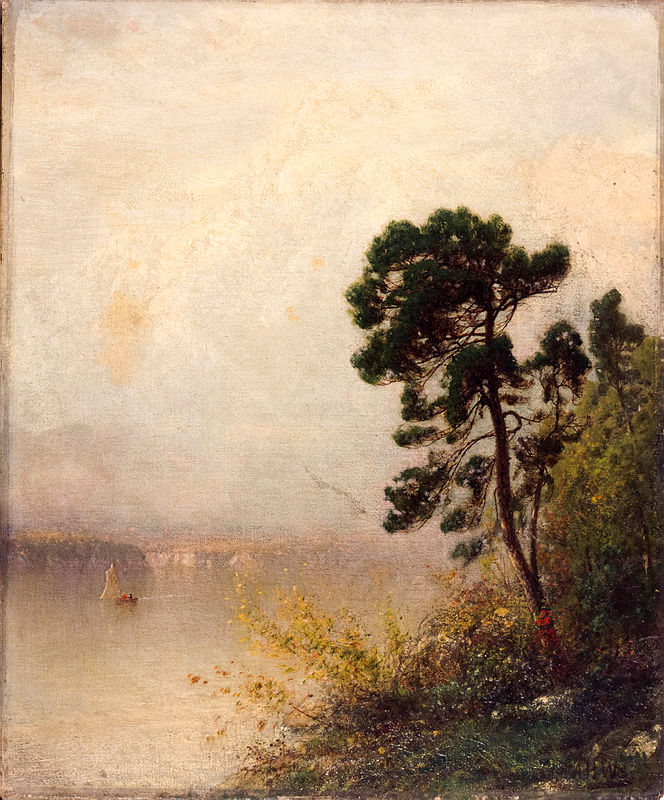
A Glimpse of Lake Champlain by Alexander Helwig Wyant, late 19th century

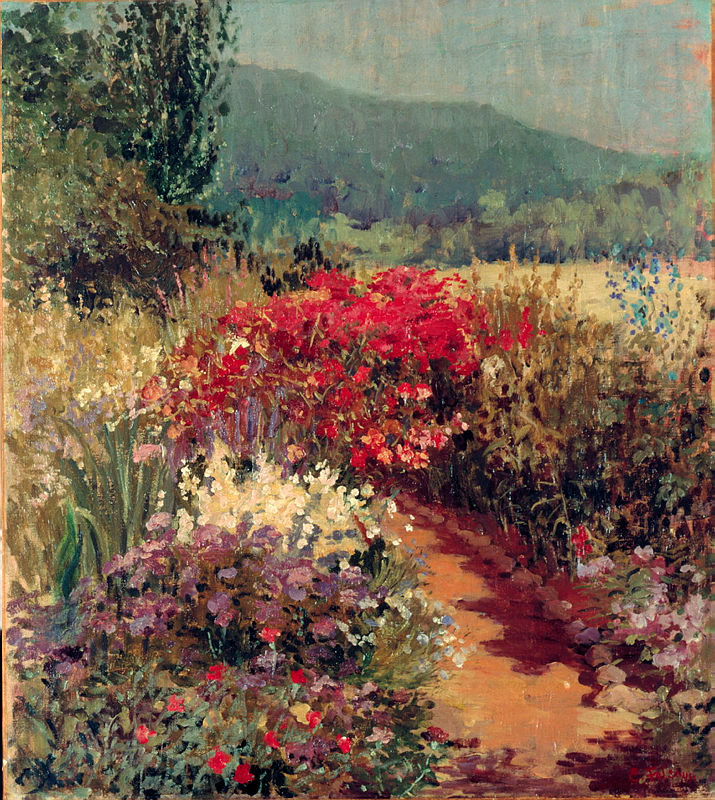
Wild Flowers by E. Folsom, late 19th century - early 20th century

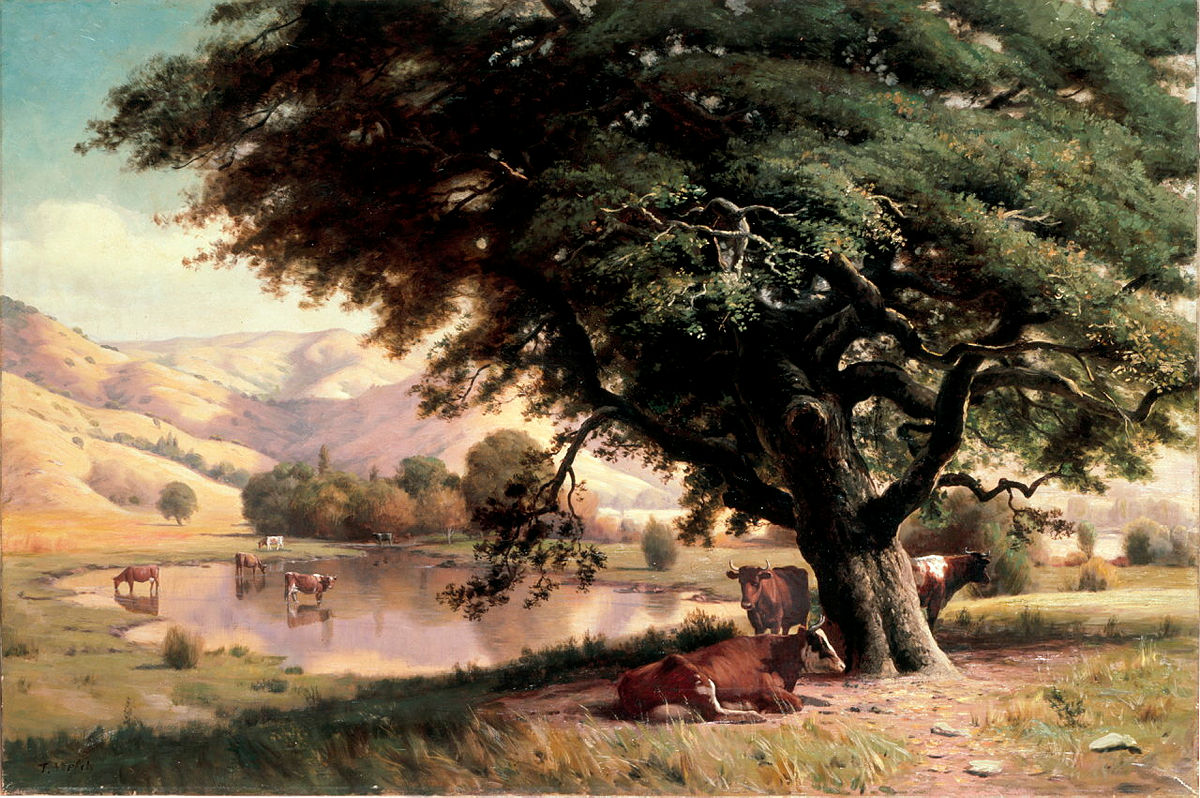
Sunny Hills, California by Thaddeus Welch, late 19th century - early 20th century

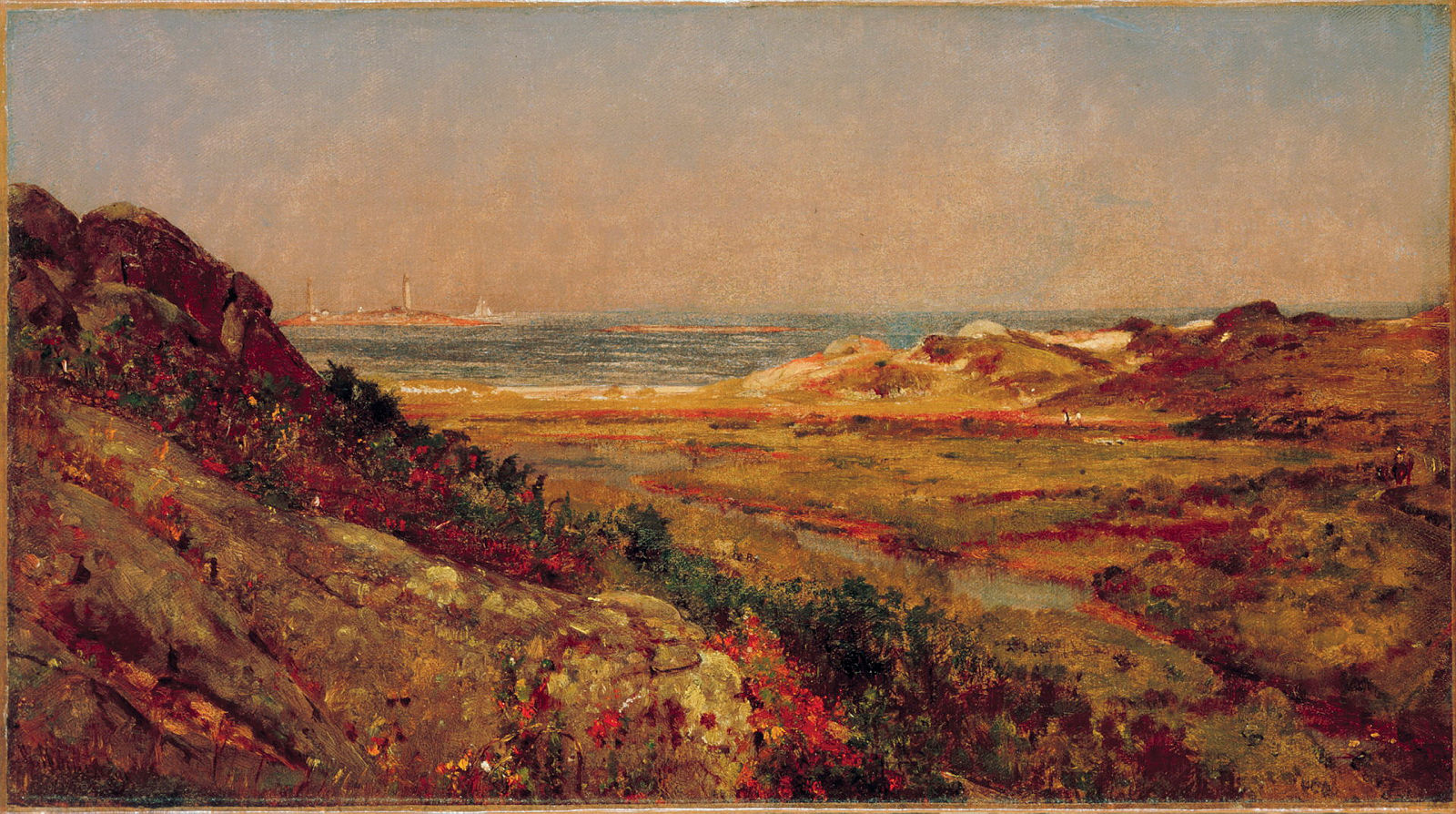
Thatcher's Island off Rockport, Massachusetts by Worthington Whittredge, early 20th century

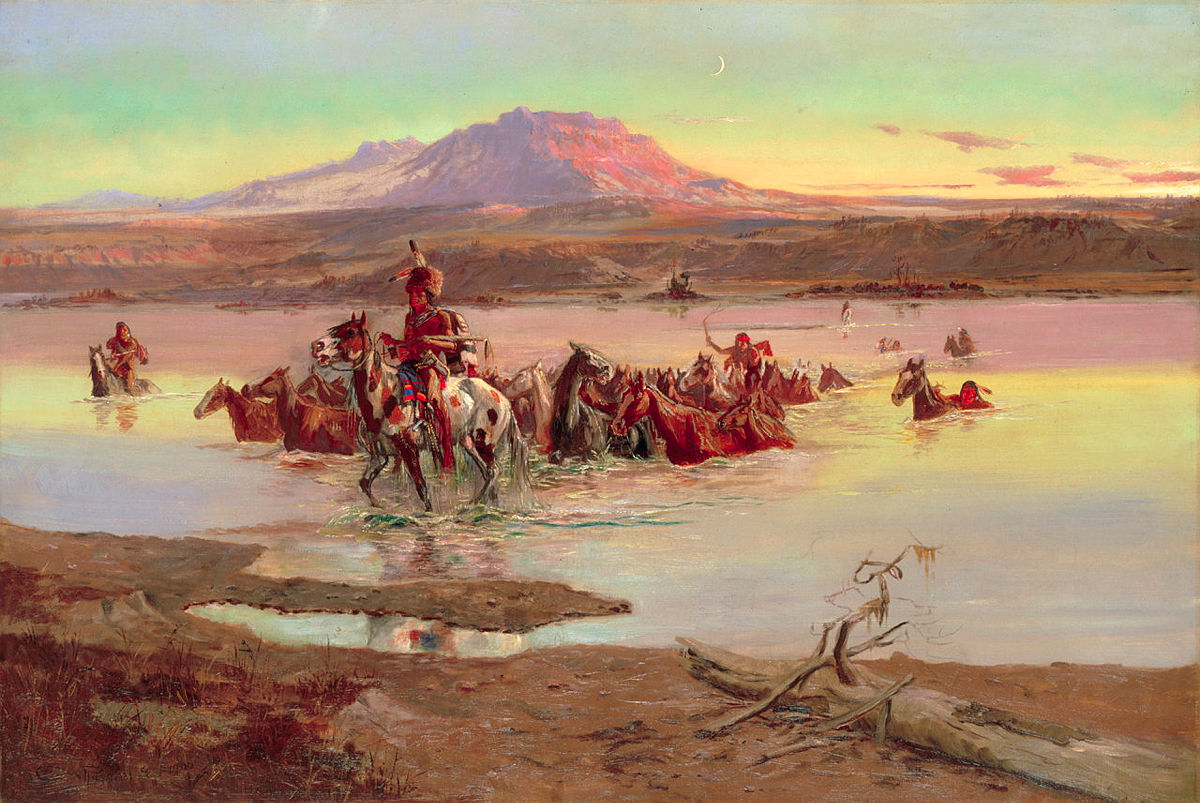
Fording the Horse Herd by Charles Marion Russell, 1900

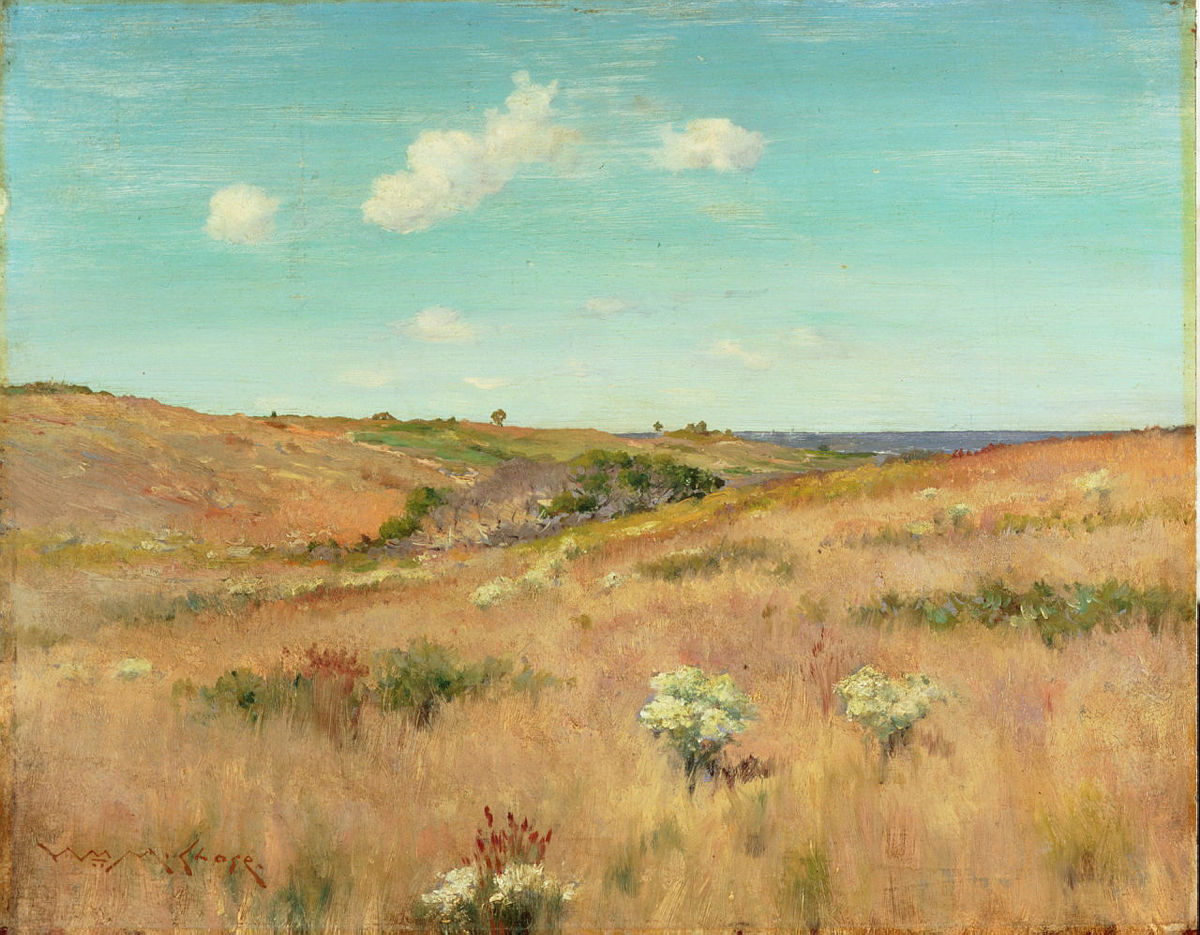
Shinnecock Hills, Long Island by William Merritt Chase, 1900

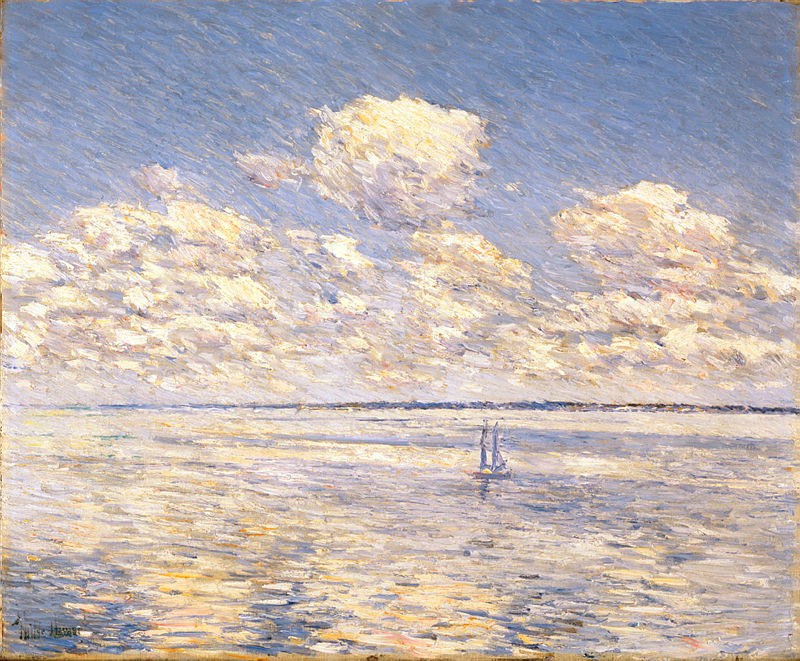
Seascape by Childe Hassam, 1900

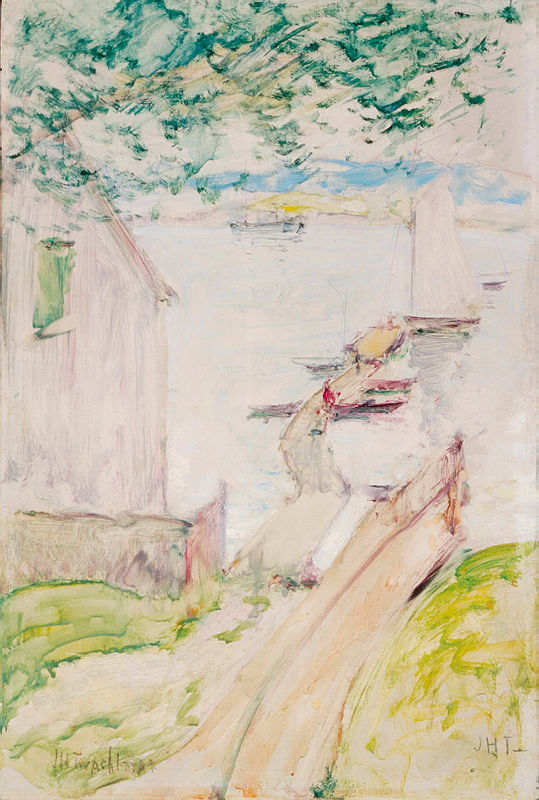
Captain Bickford's Float by John Henry Twachtman, 1900

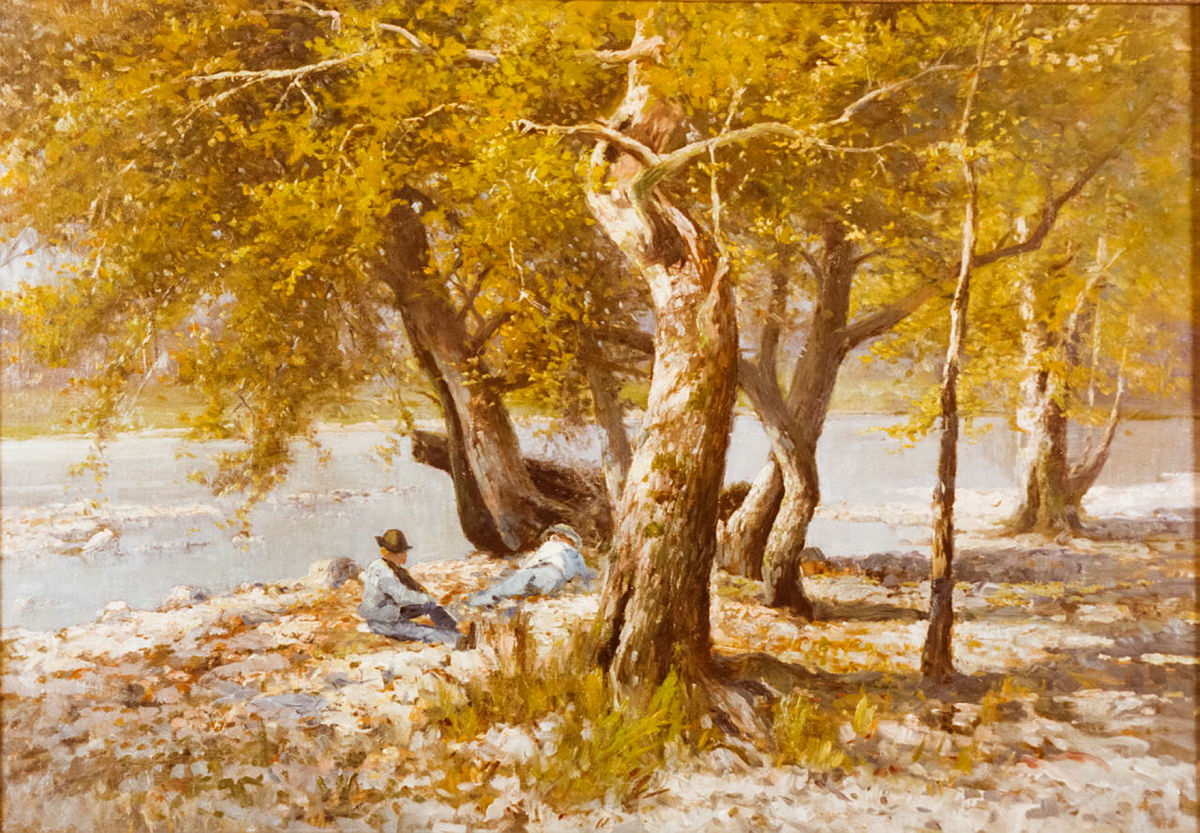
Boy Resting in the Woods by Unknown, c. 1900

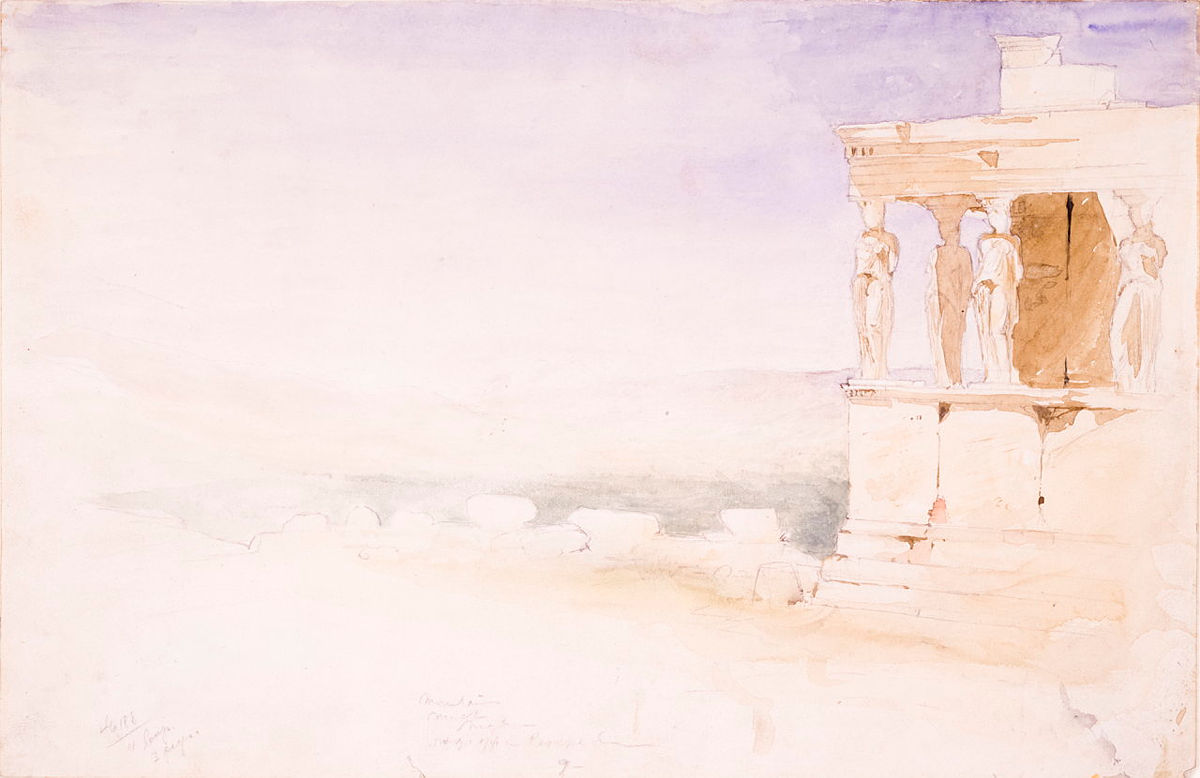
Porch of the Maidens at the Erechtheum by Stanford White, c. 1900

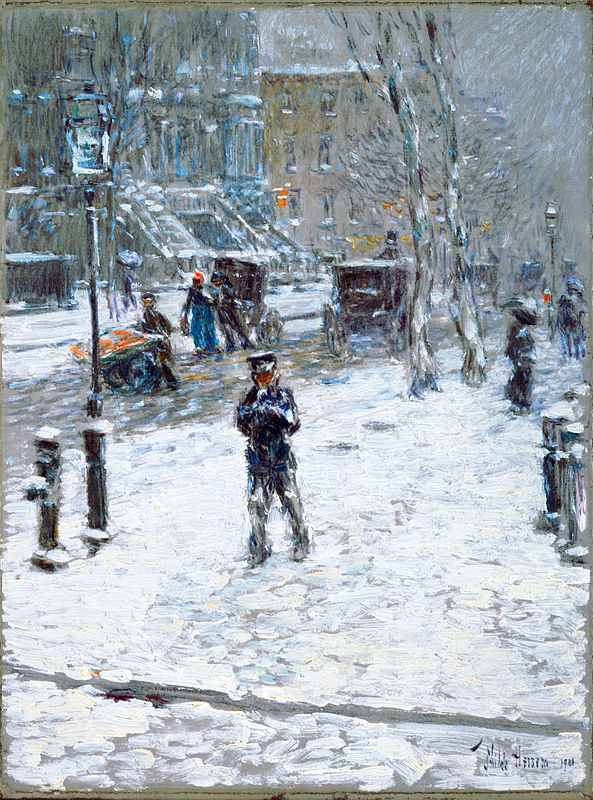
Street Scene in Winter (Snowstorm, New York) by Childe Hassam, 1901

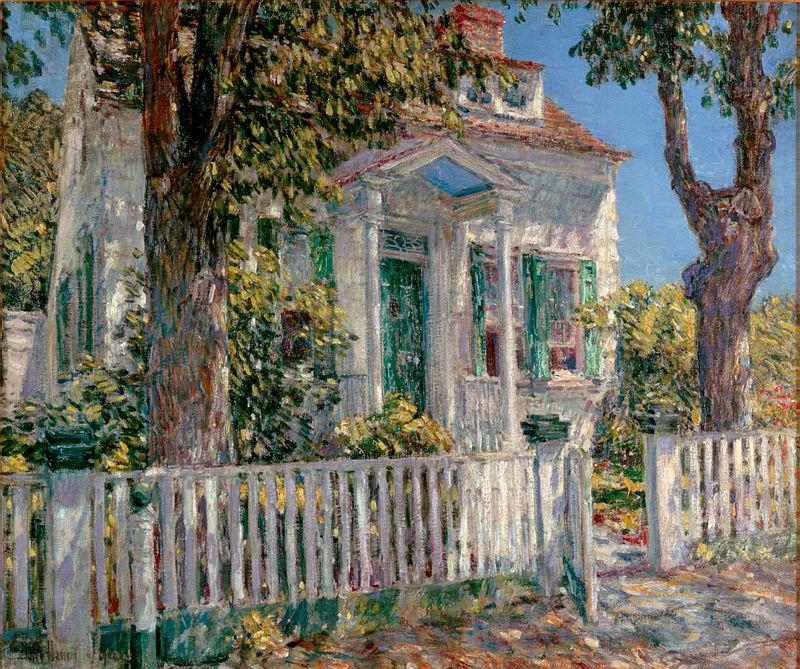
Colonial Cottage, Cos Cob by Childe Hassam, 1902

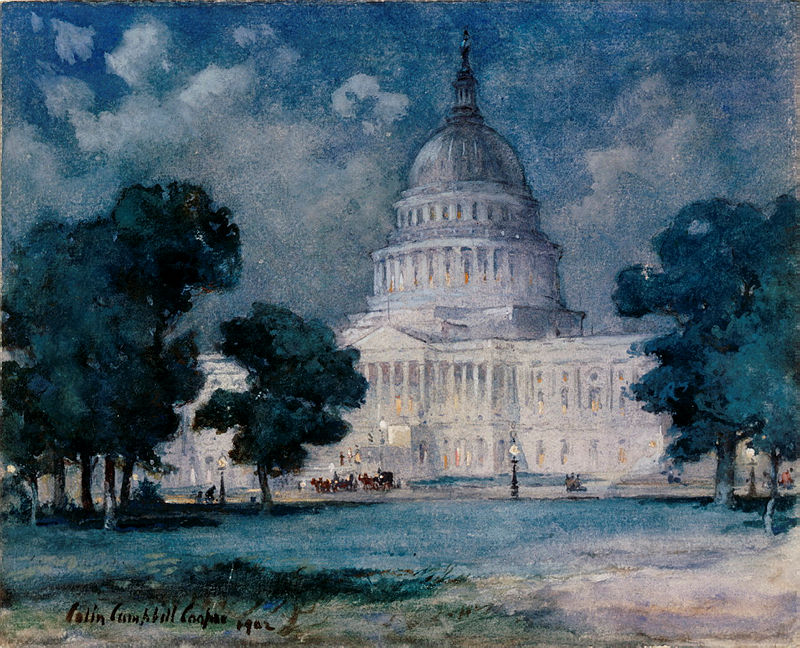
The Capitol at Night by Colin Campbell Cooper, 1902

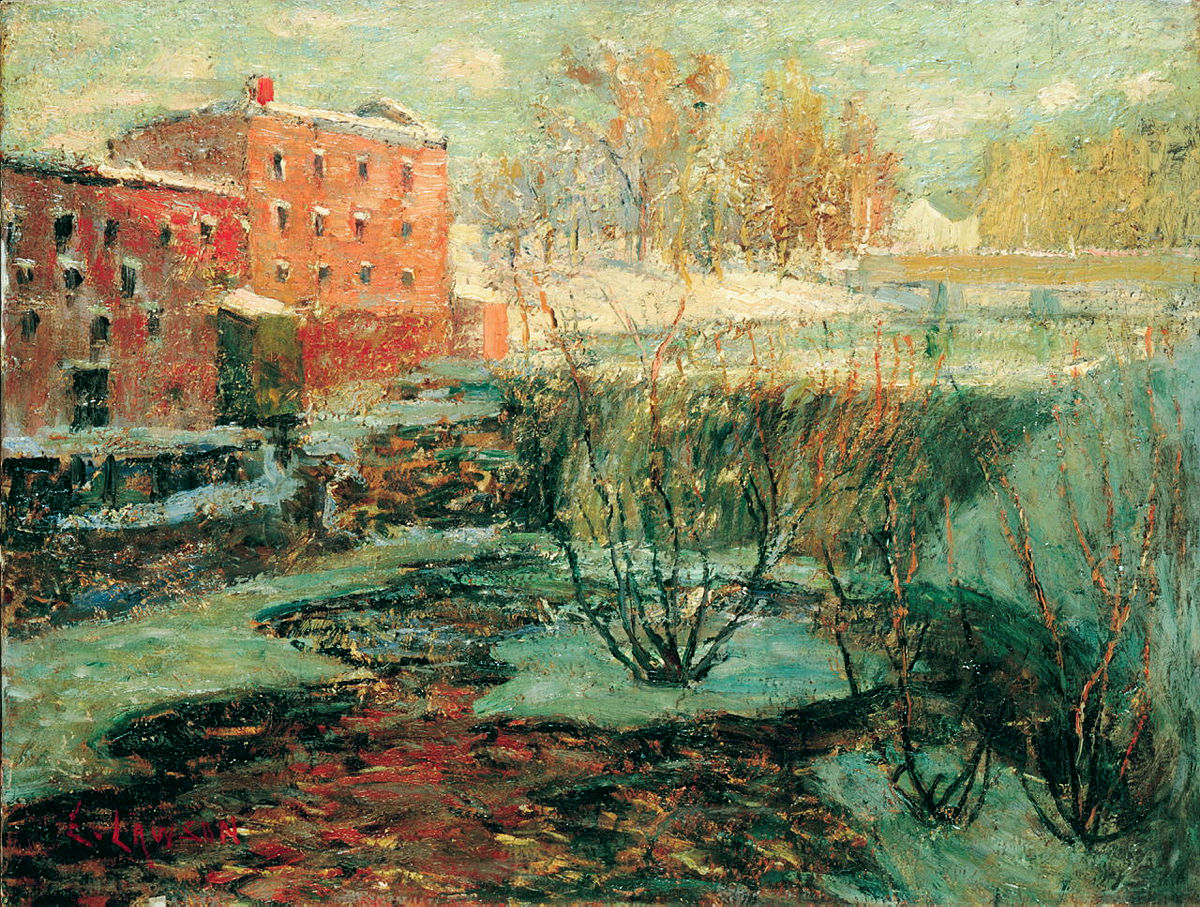
The Red Mill, by Ernest Lawson by Ernest Lawson, c. 1904

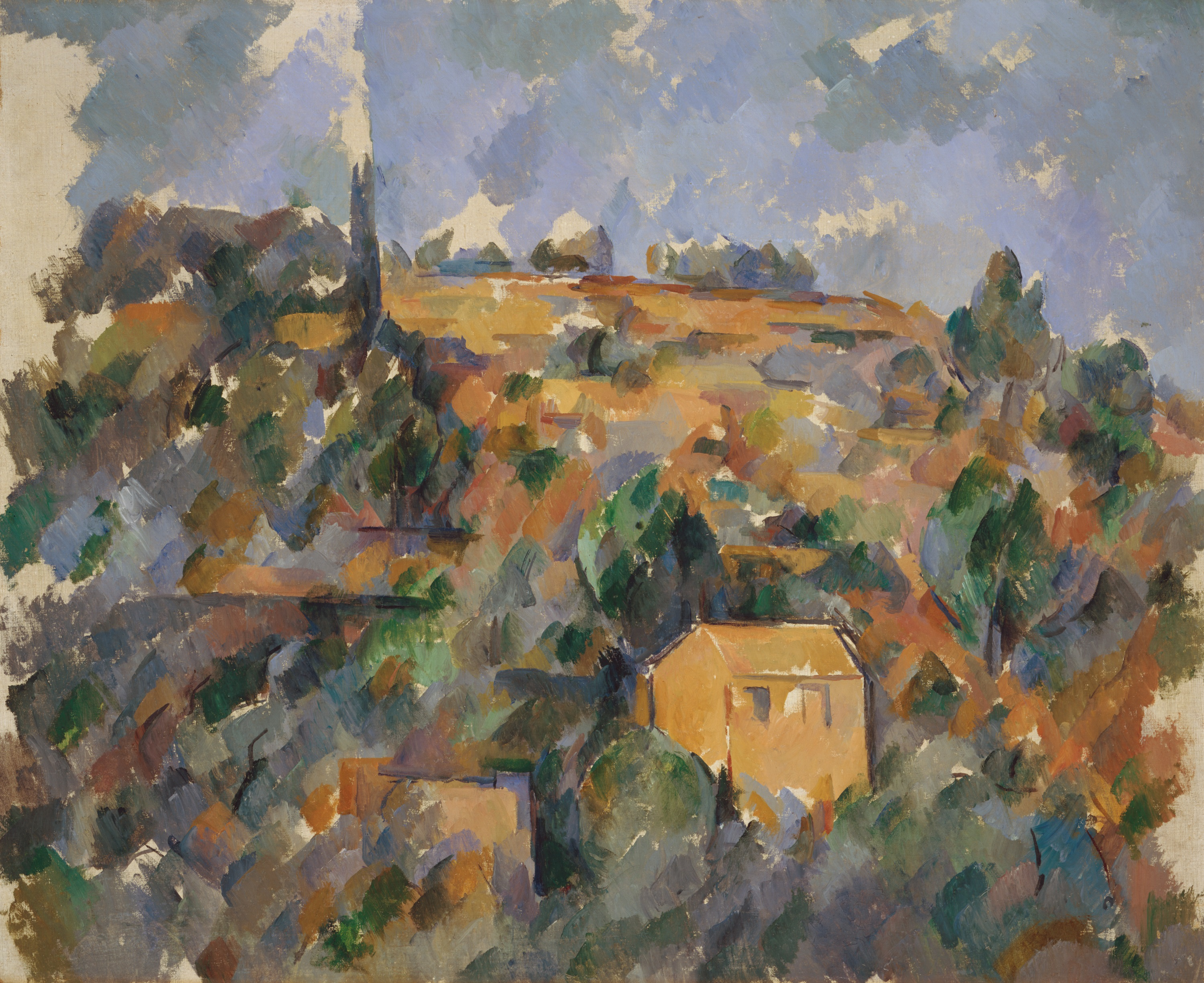
Maisons sur la colline, Provence (Houses on the Hill) by Paul Cézanne, c. 1904-1906

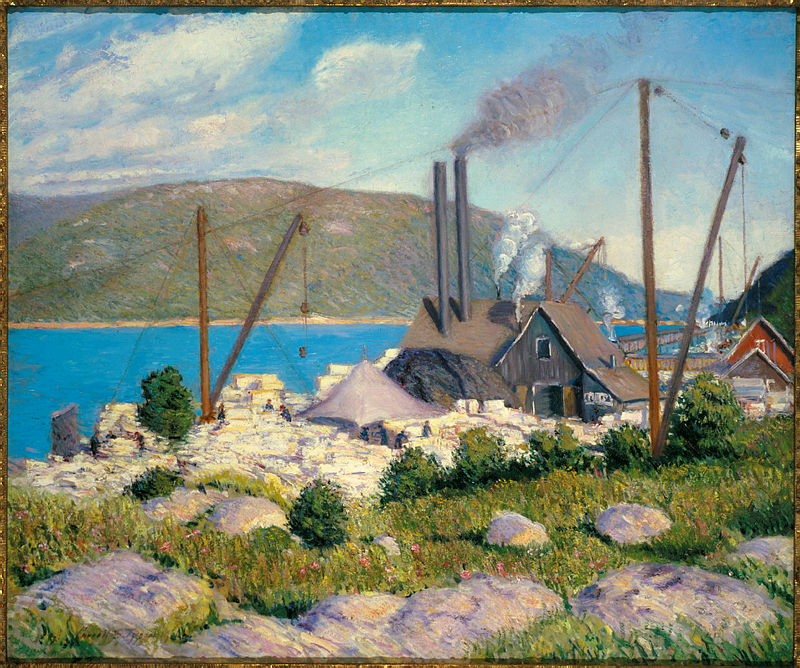
Hall's Quarry by Carroll Sargent Tyson, Jr., 1906

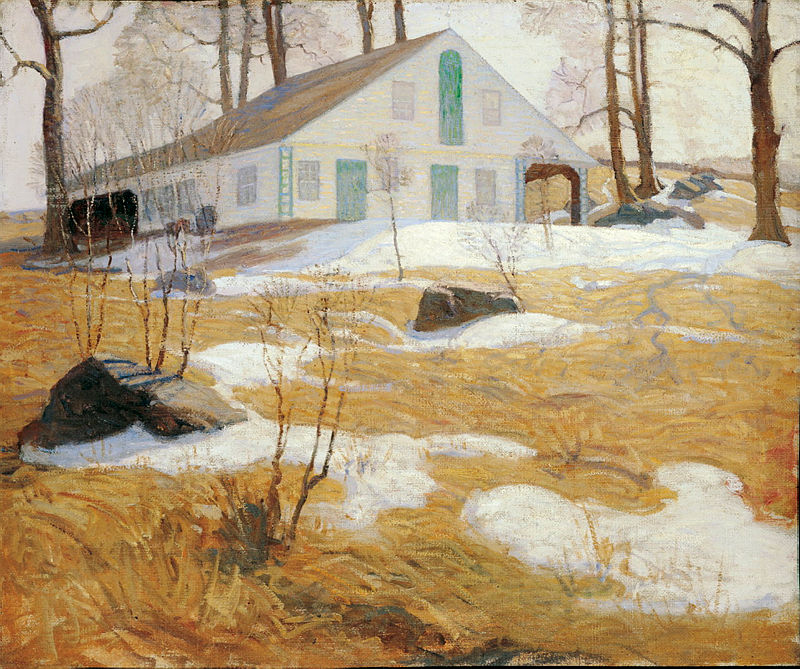
Barn in Winter by N.C. Wyeth, c. 1907

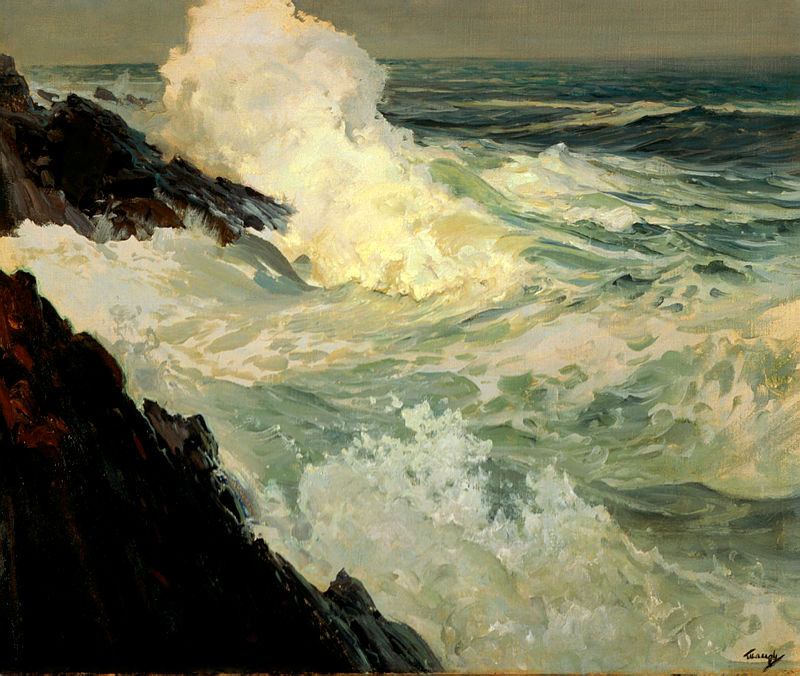
Rough Sea at Bailey's Island, Maine by Frederick Judd Waugh, 1909

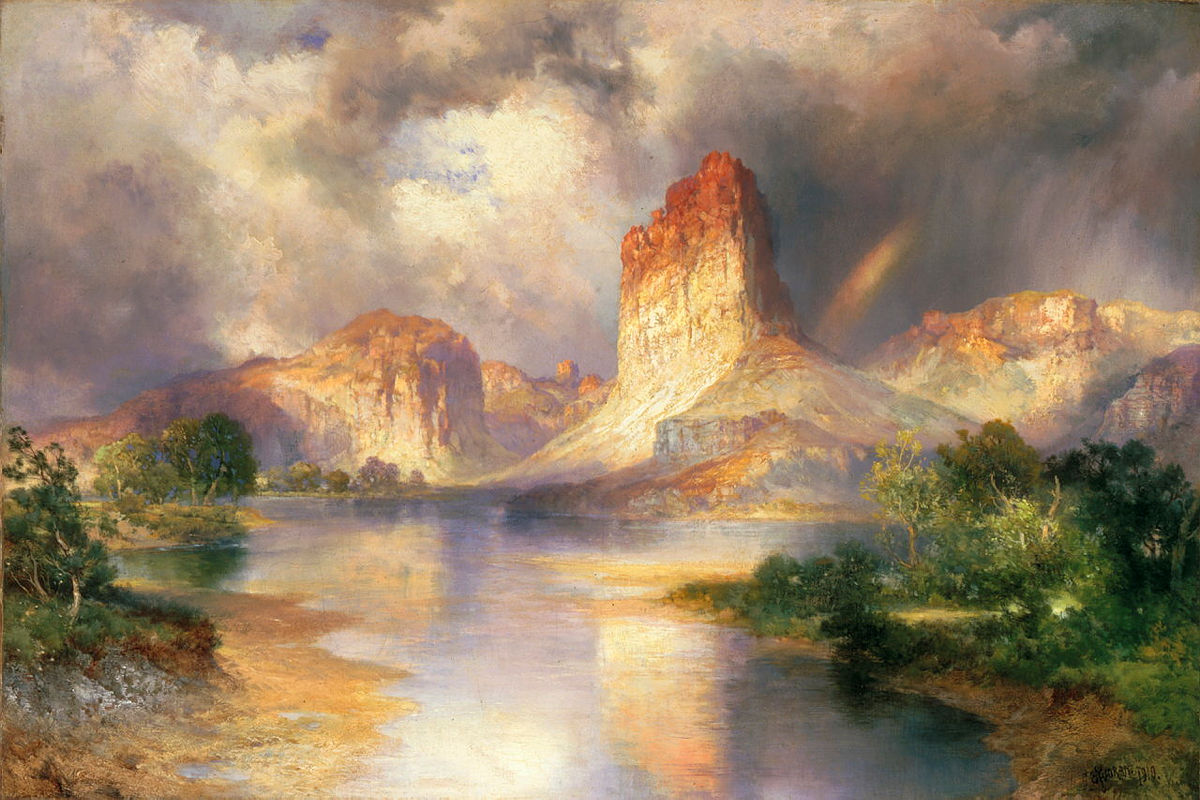
Cliffs of Green River, Wyoming by Thomas Moran, c. 1909-1910

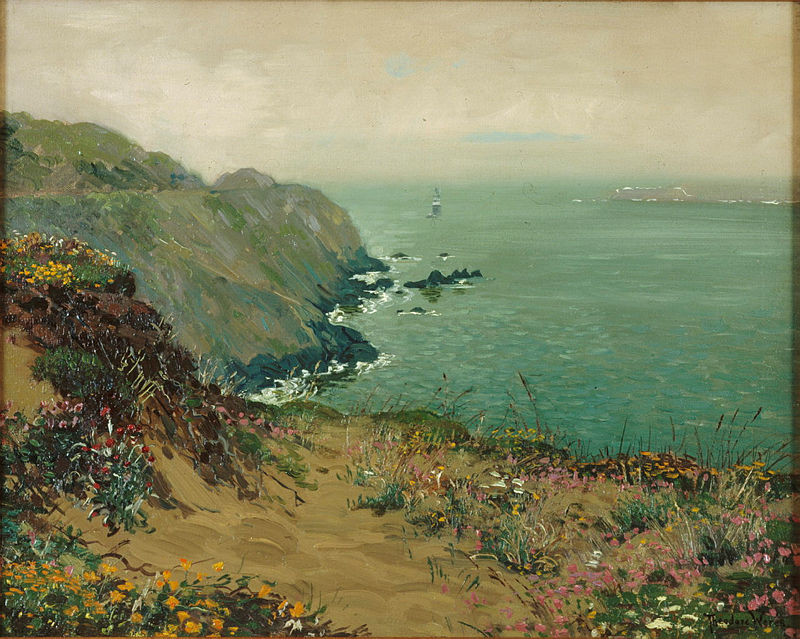
Golden Gate, Lands End by Theodore Wores, c. 1911-1912

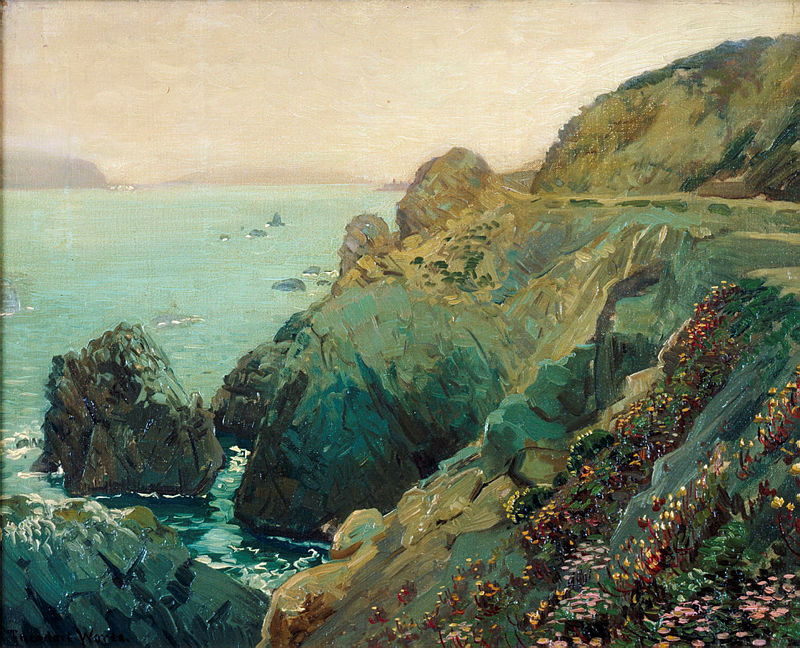
Lands End Looking Towards the Golden Gate by Theodore Wores, c. 1911-1912

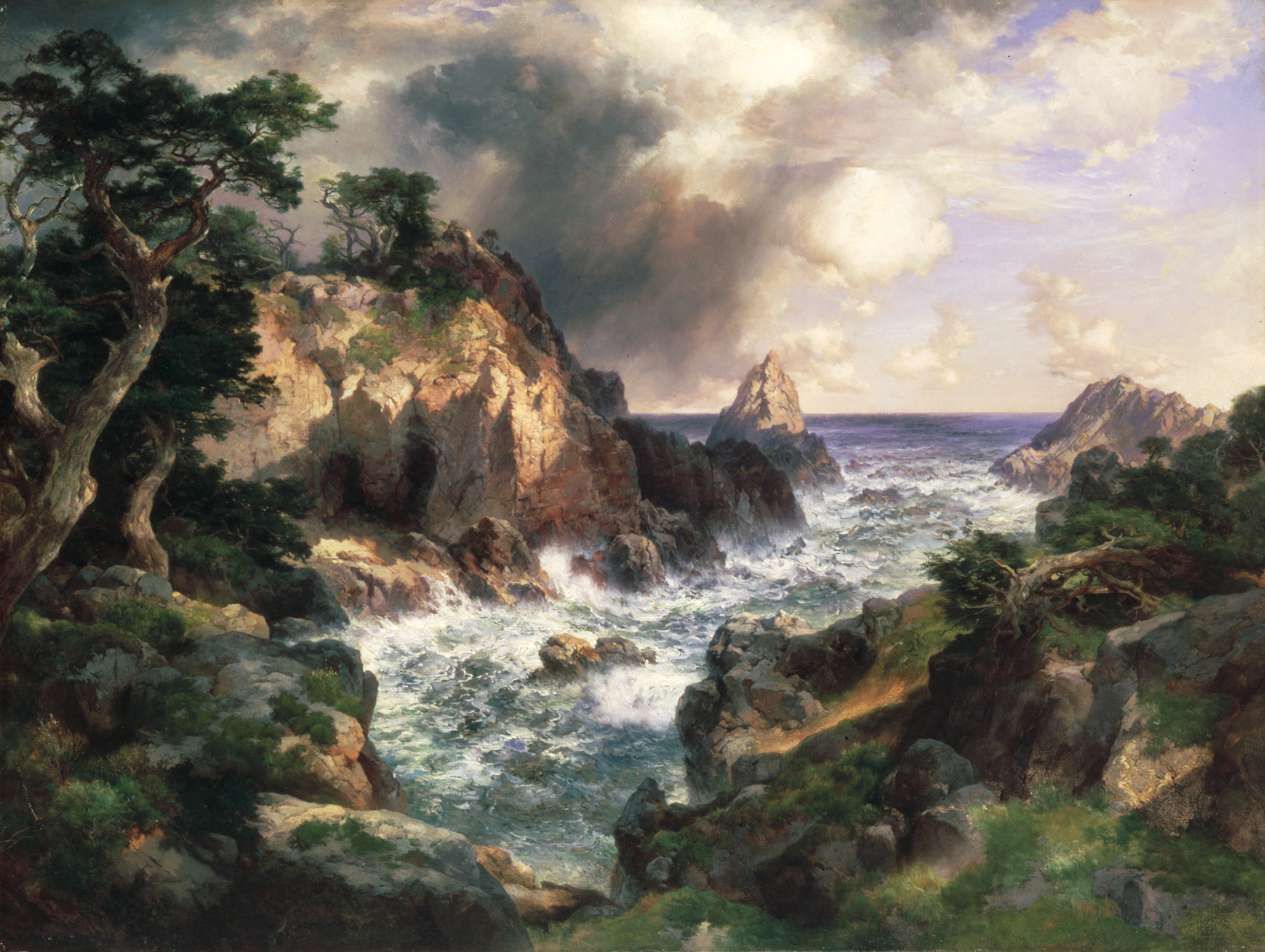
Point Lobos, Monterey, California by Thomas Moran, 1912

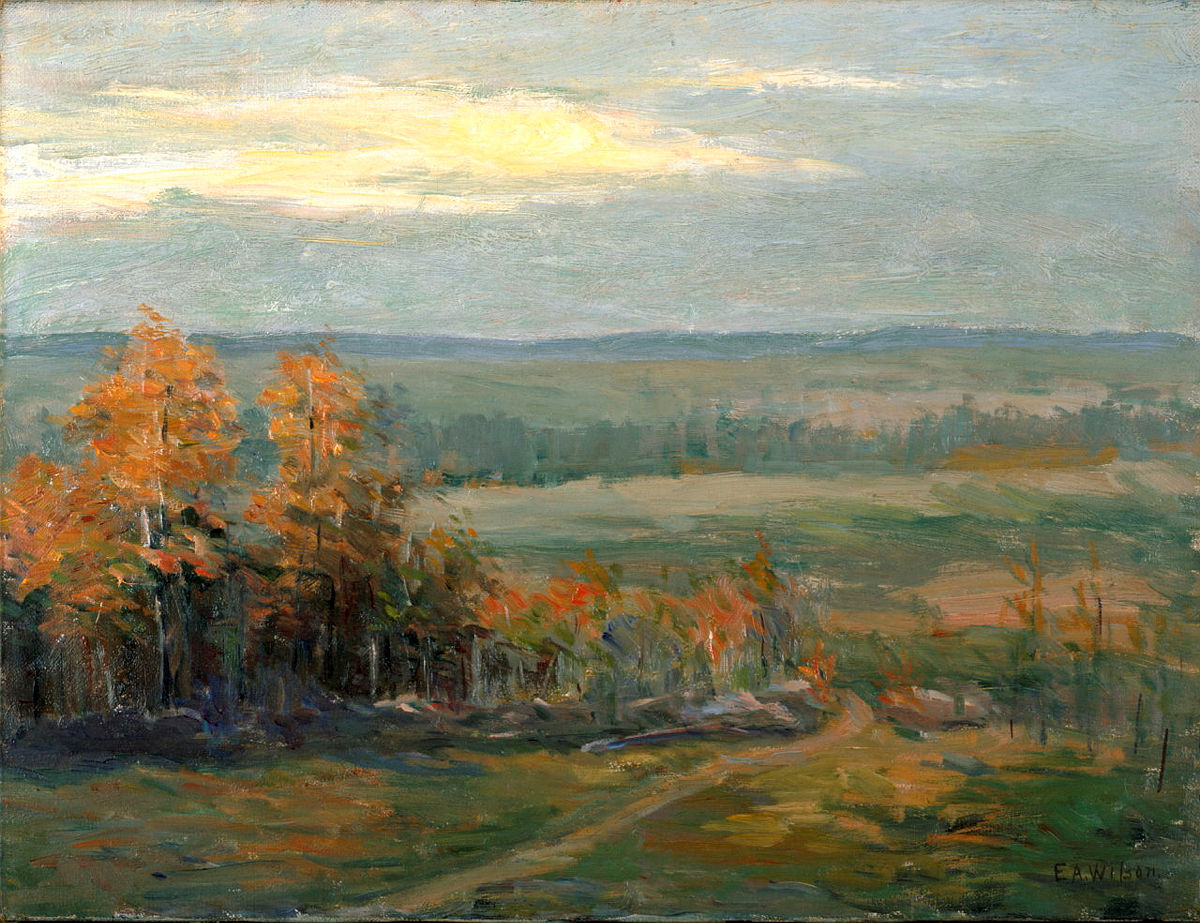
Princeton Landscape by Ellen Axson Wilson, c. 1913

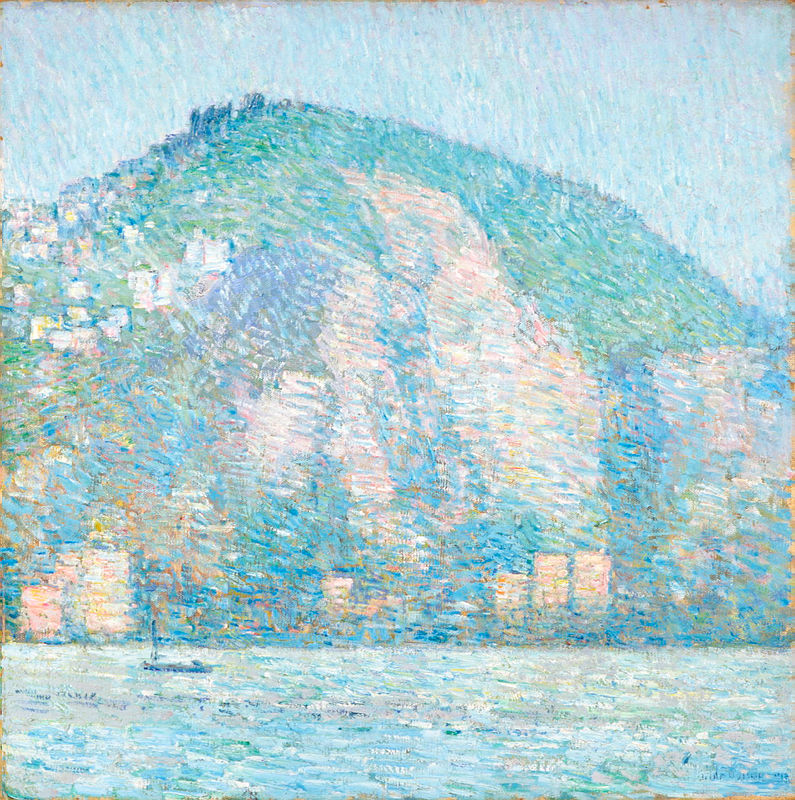
Telegraph Hill - San Francisco by Childe Hassam, 1914

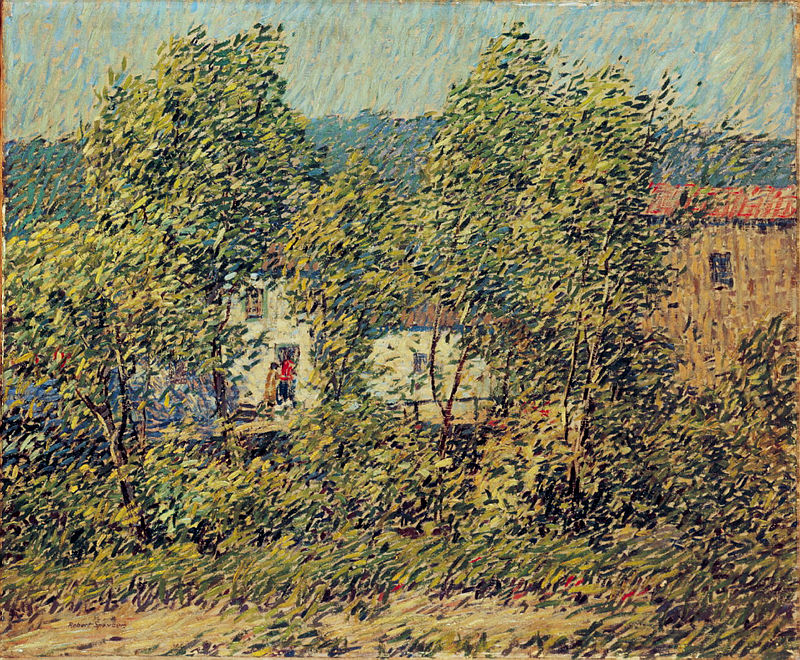
May Breezes by Robert Spencer, 1914

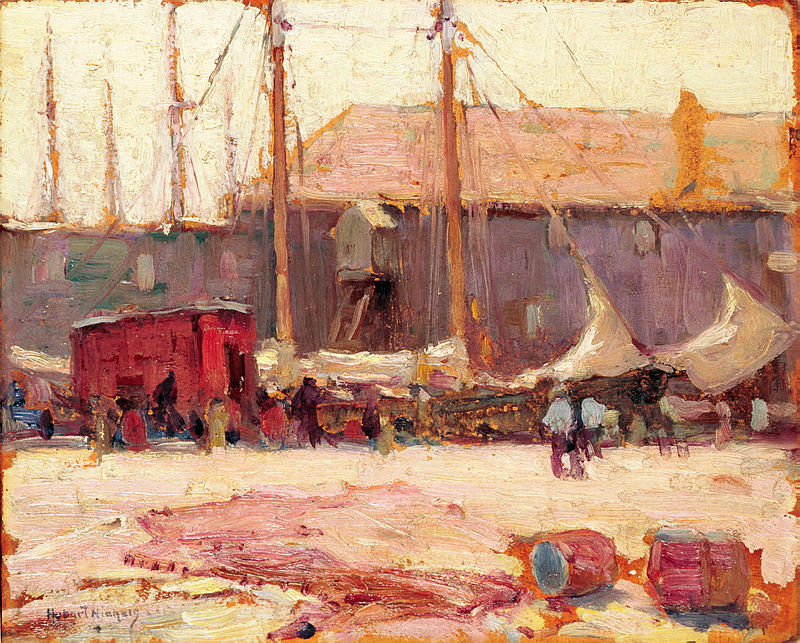
Gloucester Dock by Henry Hobart Nichols, 1915

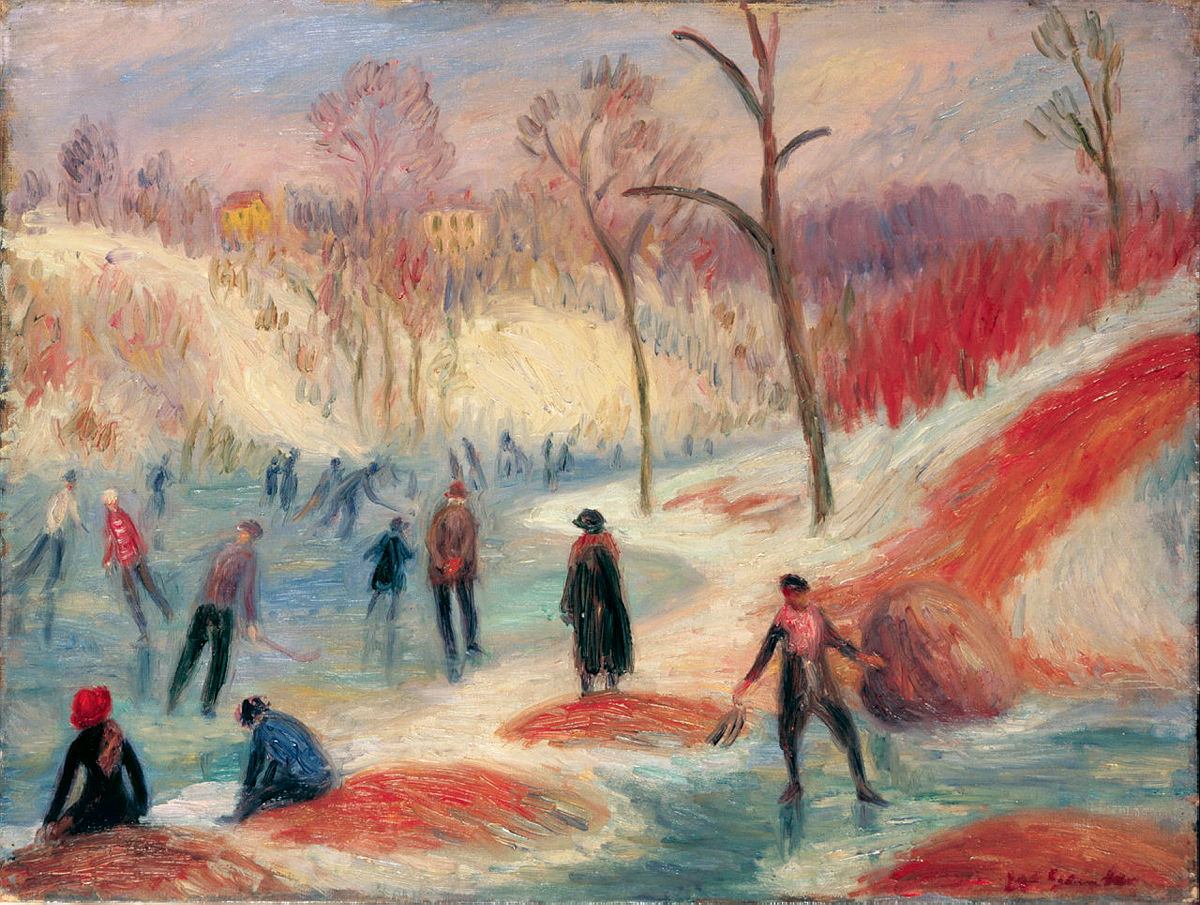
Clove Pond by William James Glackens, c. 1916

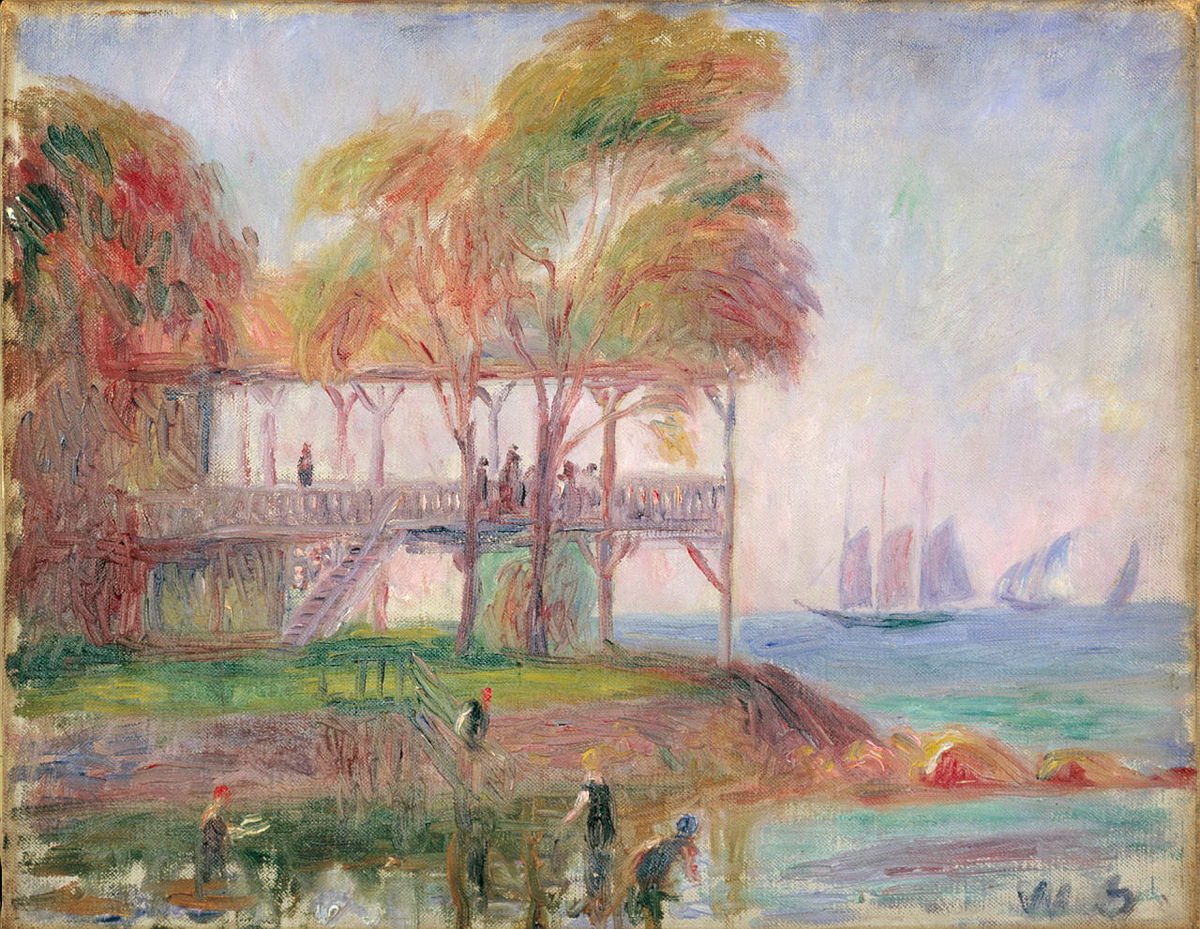
Pavilion at Gloucester by William James Glackens, 1919

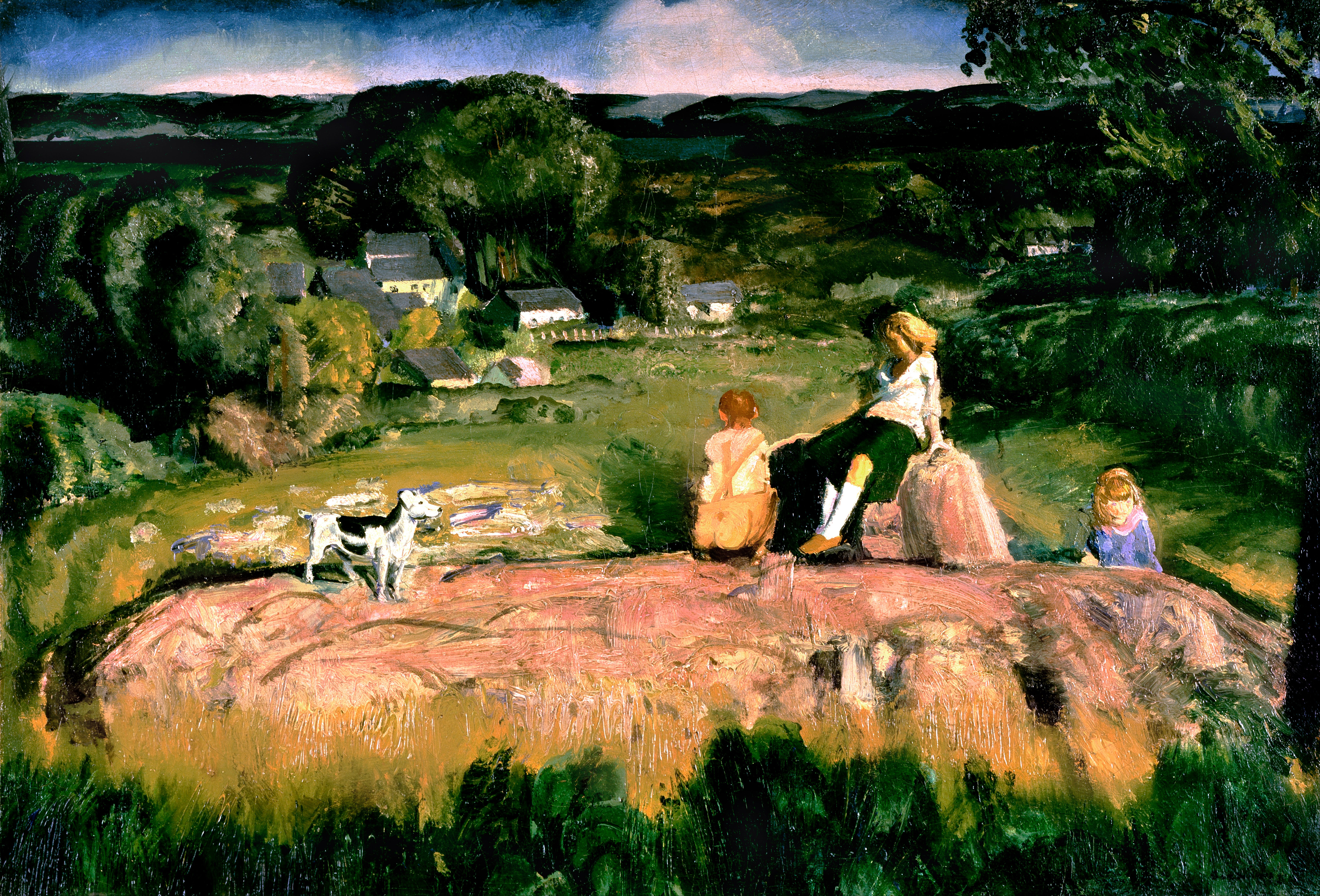
Three Children by George Bellows, 1919

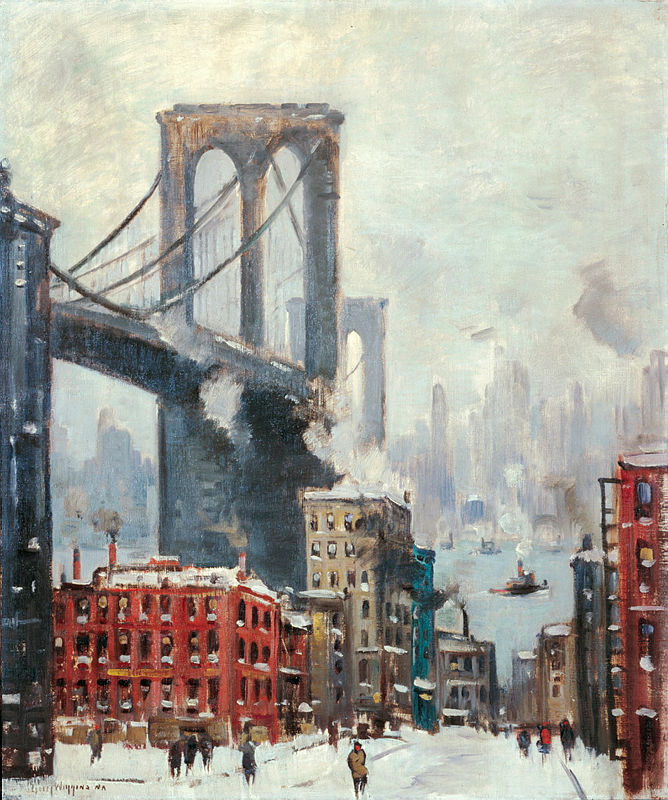
Brooklyn Bridge, Winter by Guy C. Wiggins, c. 1920-1930

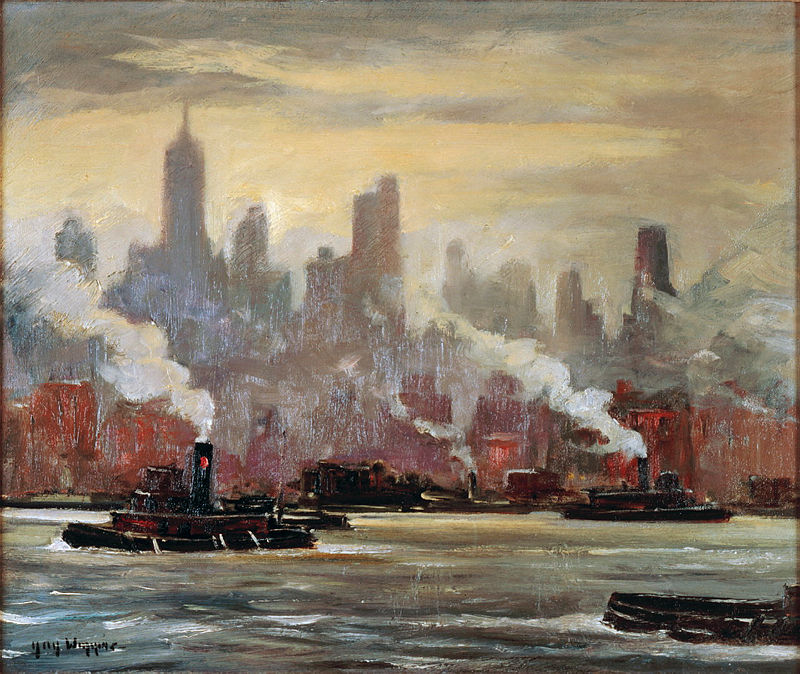
East River, New York by Guy C. Wiggins, c. 1920-1930

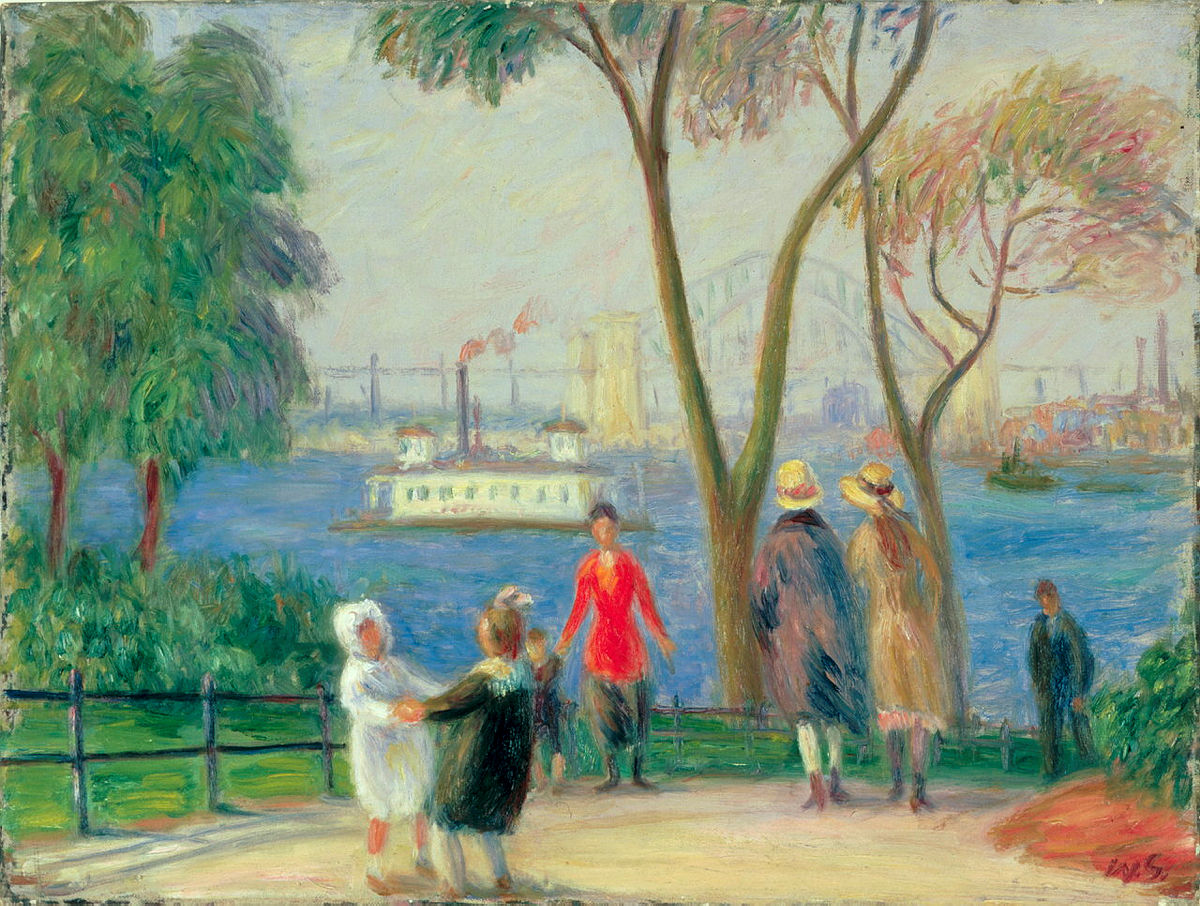
Carl Schurz Park by William James Glackens, c. 1922

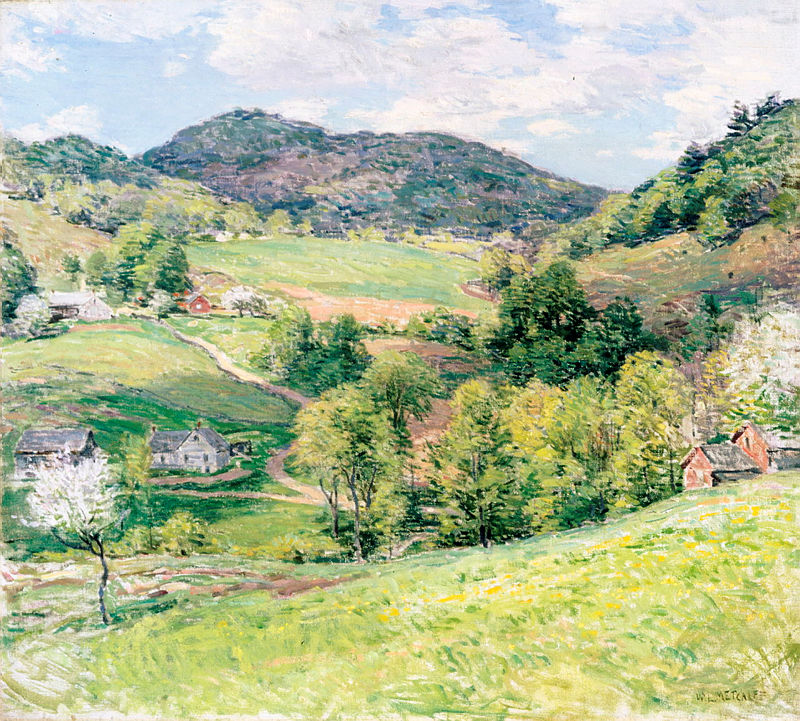
Spring in the Valley by Willard Metcalf, c. 1924

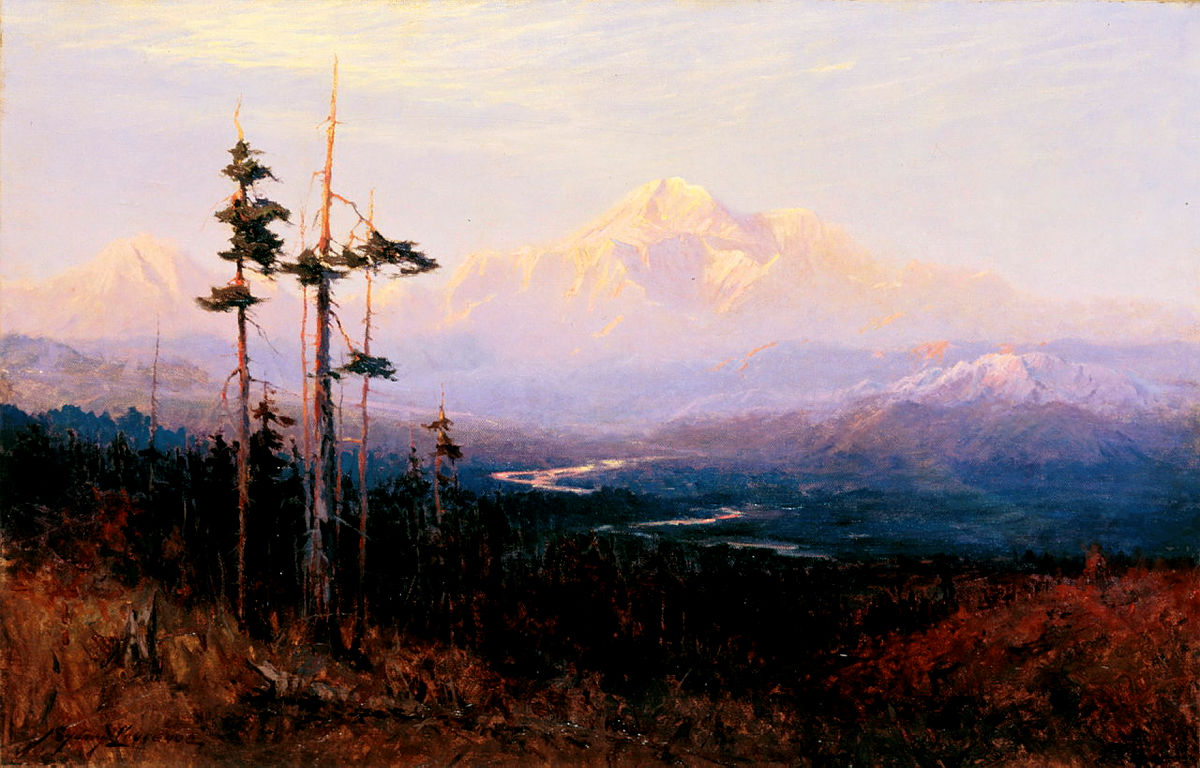
September Evening, Mount McKinley, Alaska by Sydney Laurence, 1925

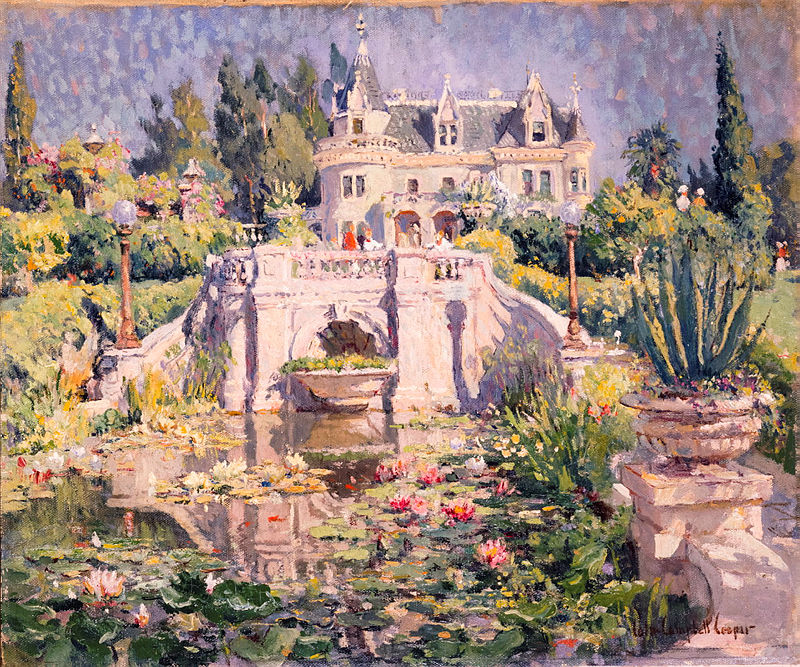
Kimberly Crest, Redlands, California by Colin Campbell Cooper, c. 1929

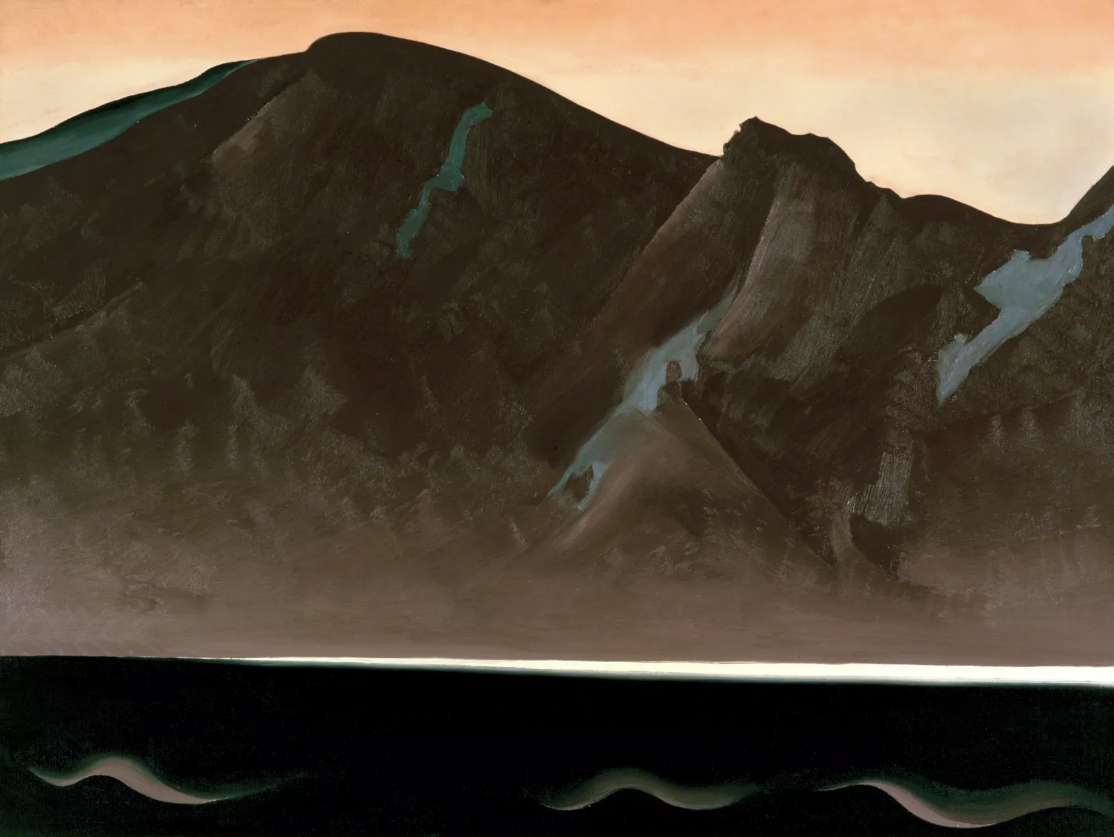
Mountain at Bear Lake—Taos by Georgia O'Keeffe, 1930

=== Marine paintings ===
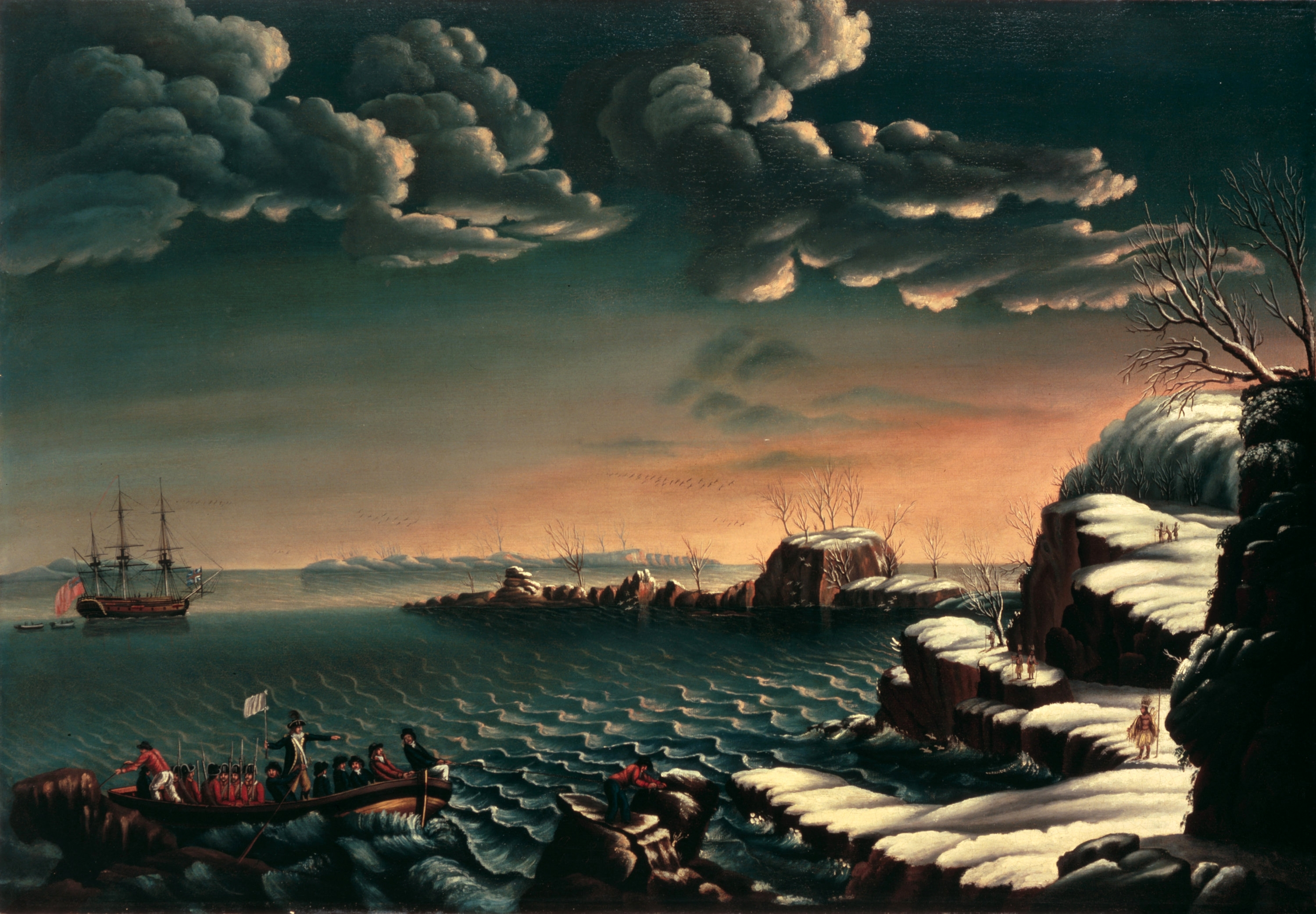
Landing of the Pilgrims by Michele Felice Cornè, between c. 1805 and c. 1807

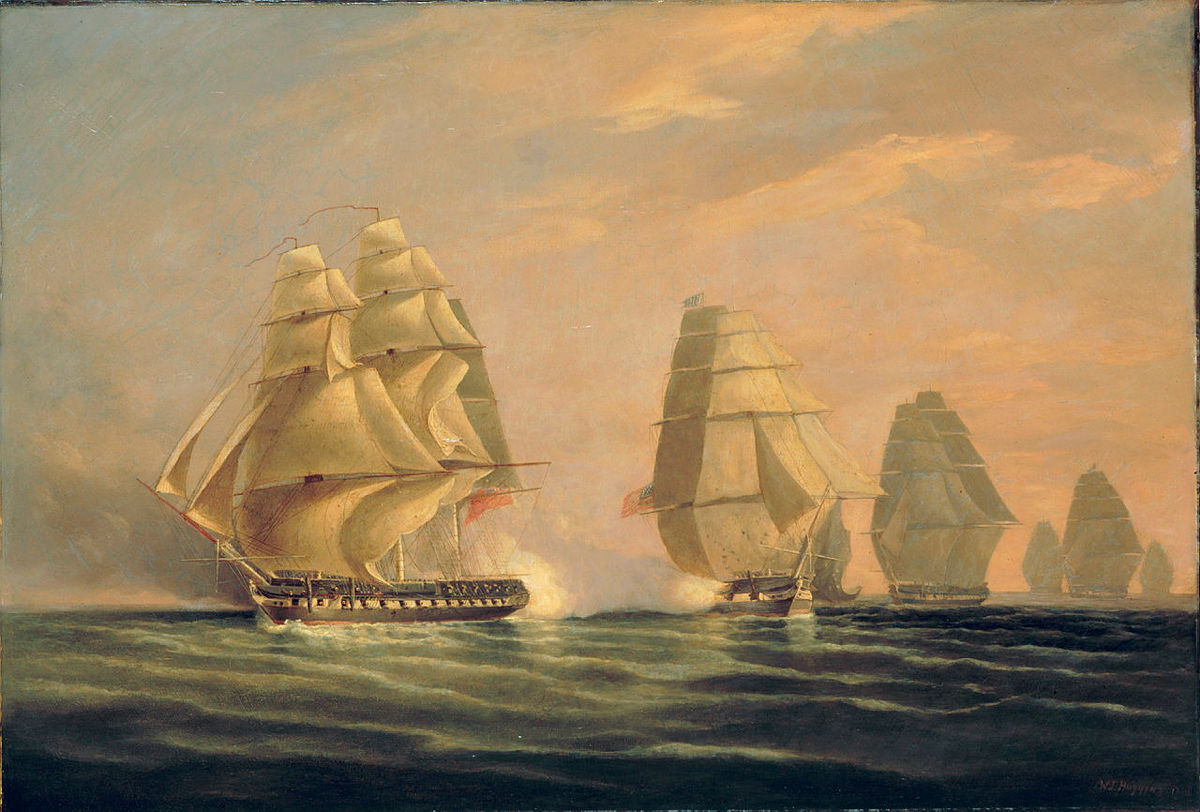
The First Naval Action in the War of 1812 by William John Huggins, 1816

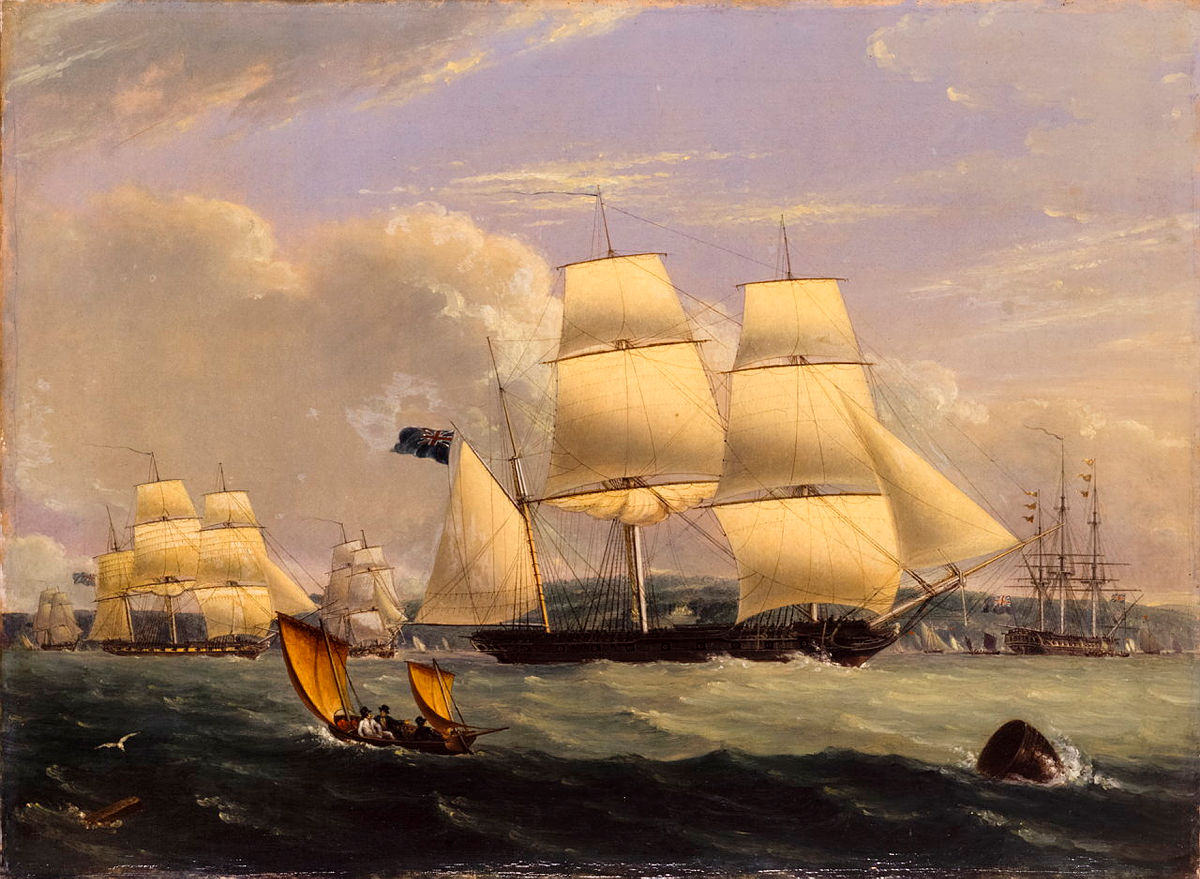
Three-Masted British Barque by Henry Moses, c. 1820-1840

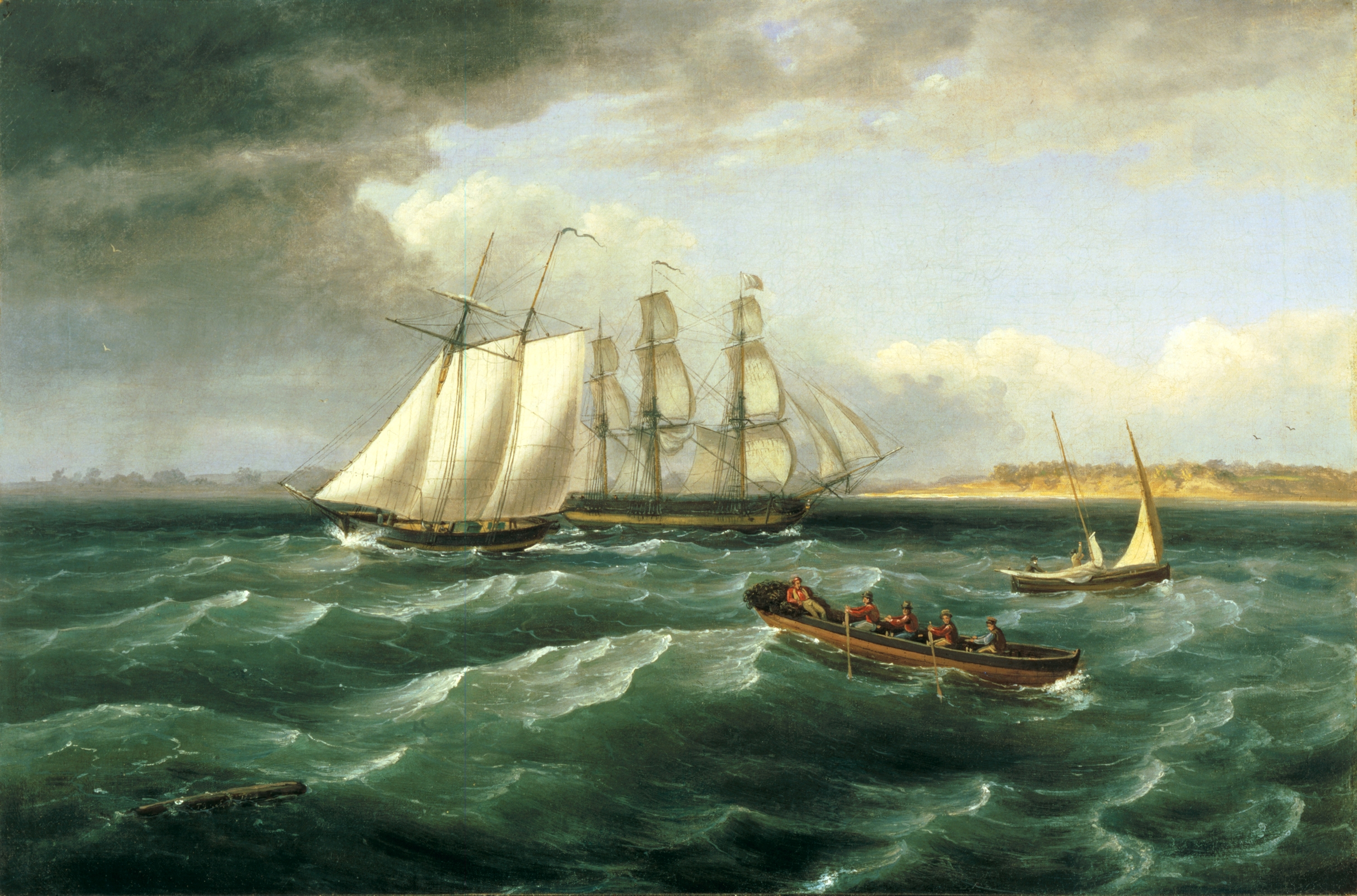
Mouth of the Delaware by Thomas Birch, 1828

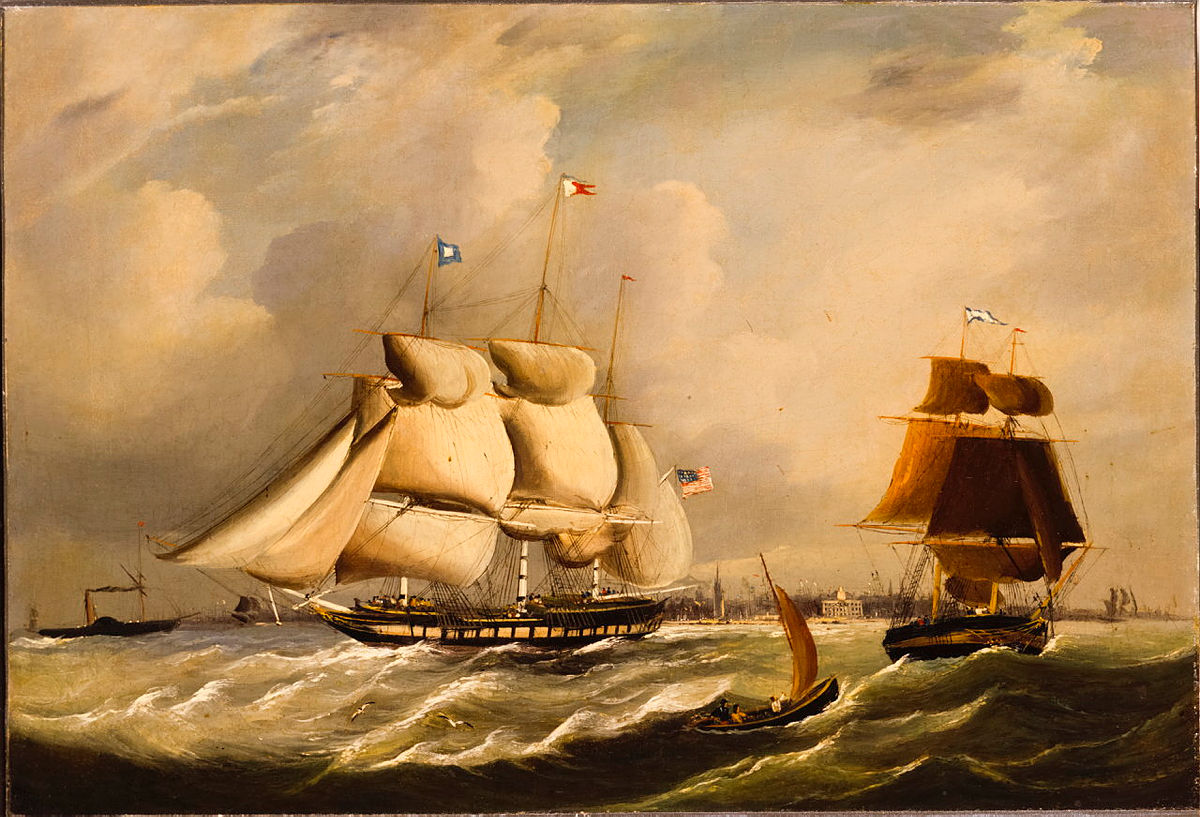
Three-Master American Barque by William James Bennett, c. 1830-1840

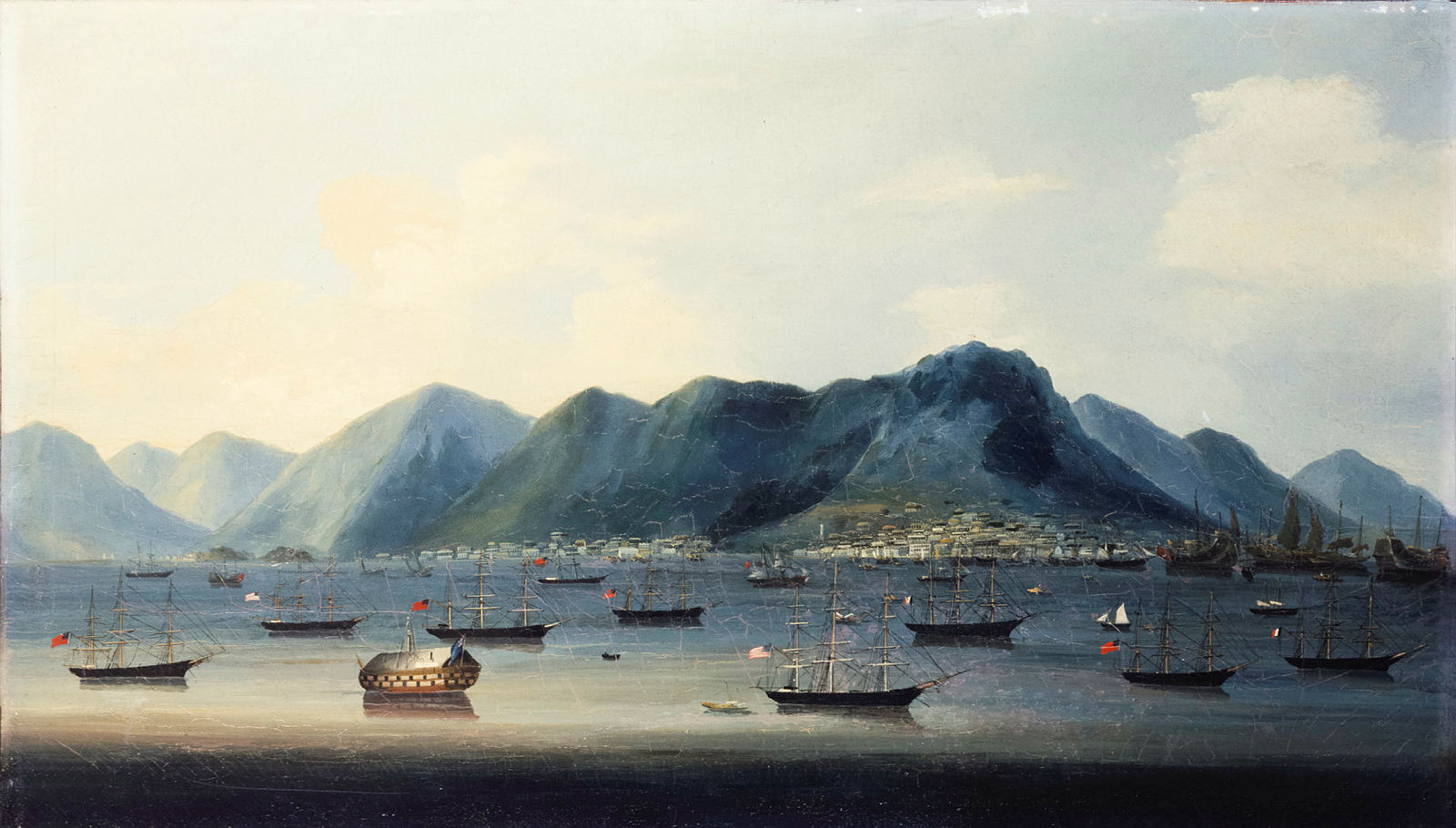
View of the Harbor of Hong Kong by Unknown, c. 1847-1856

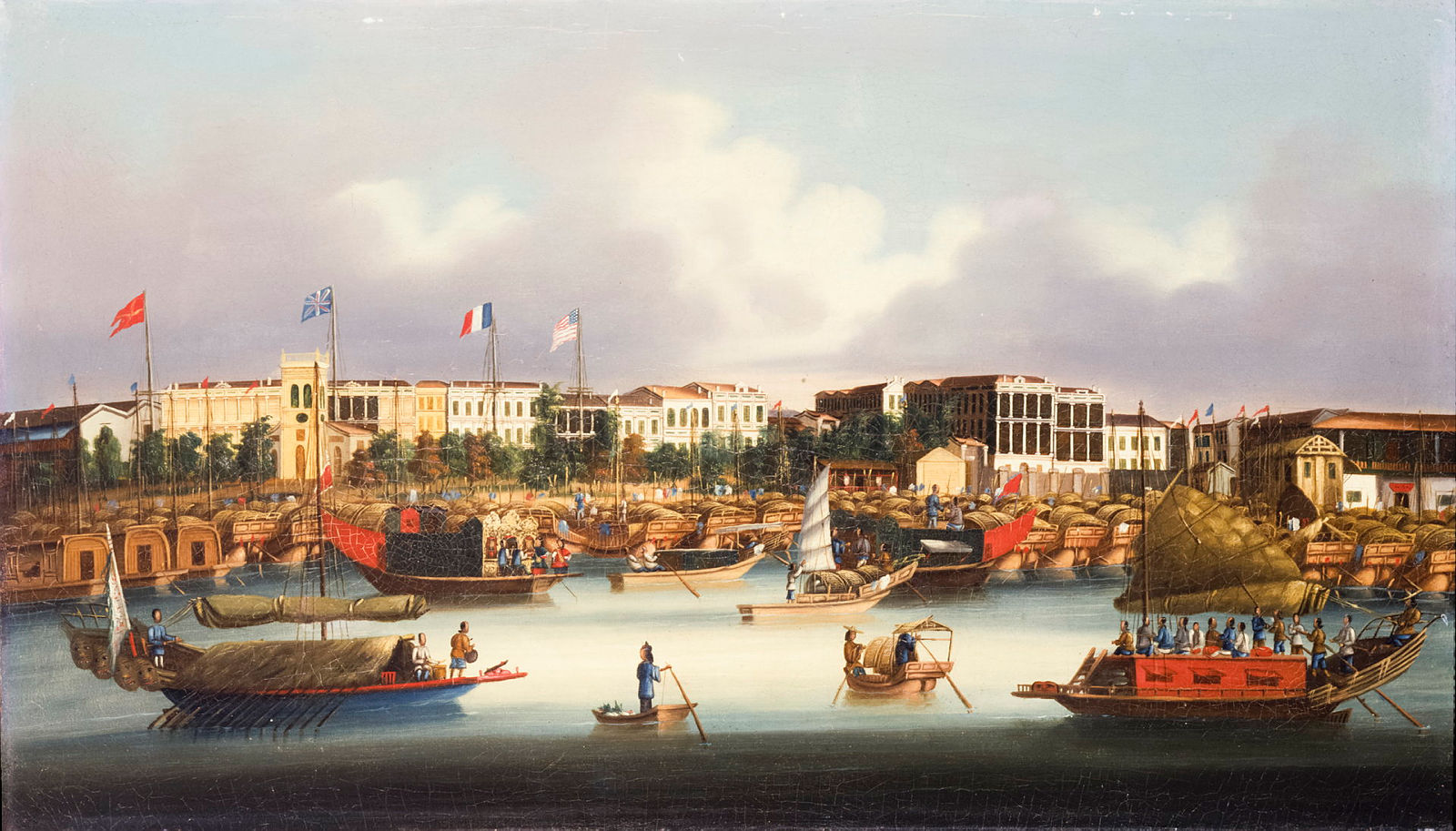
View of the Harbor at Canton by Unknown, c. 1847-1856

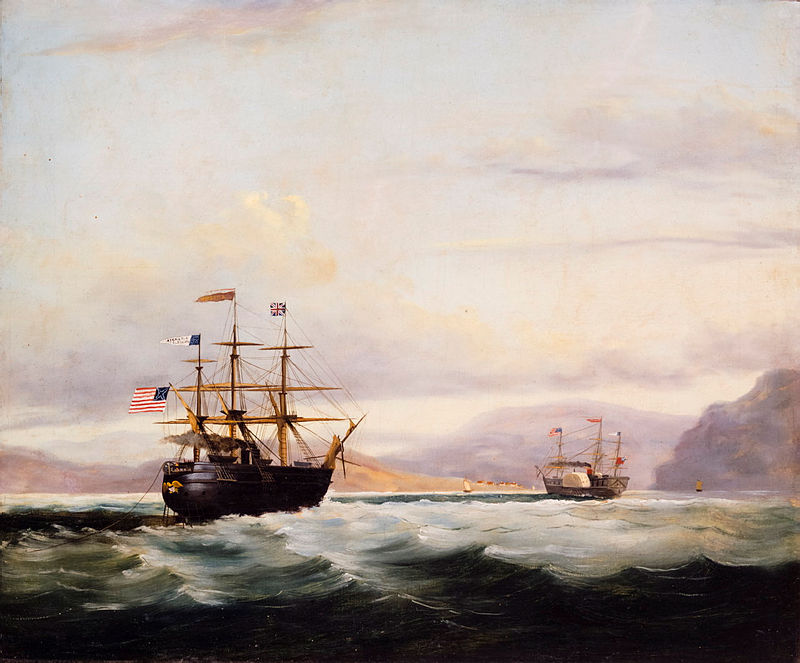
Laying of the Atlantic Cable by Unknown, c. 1850

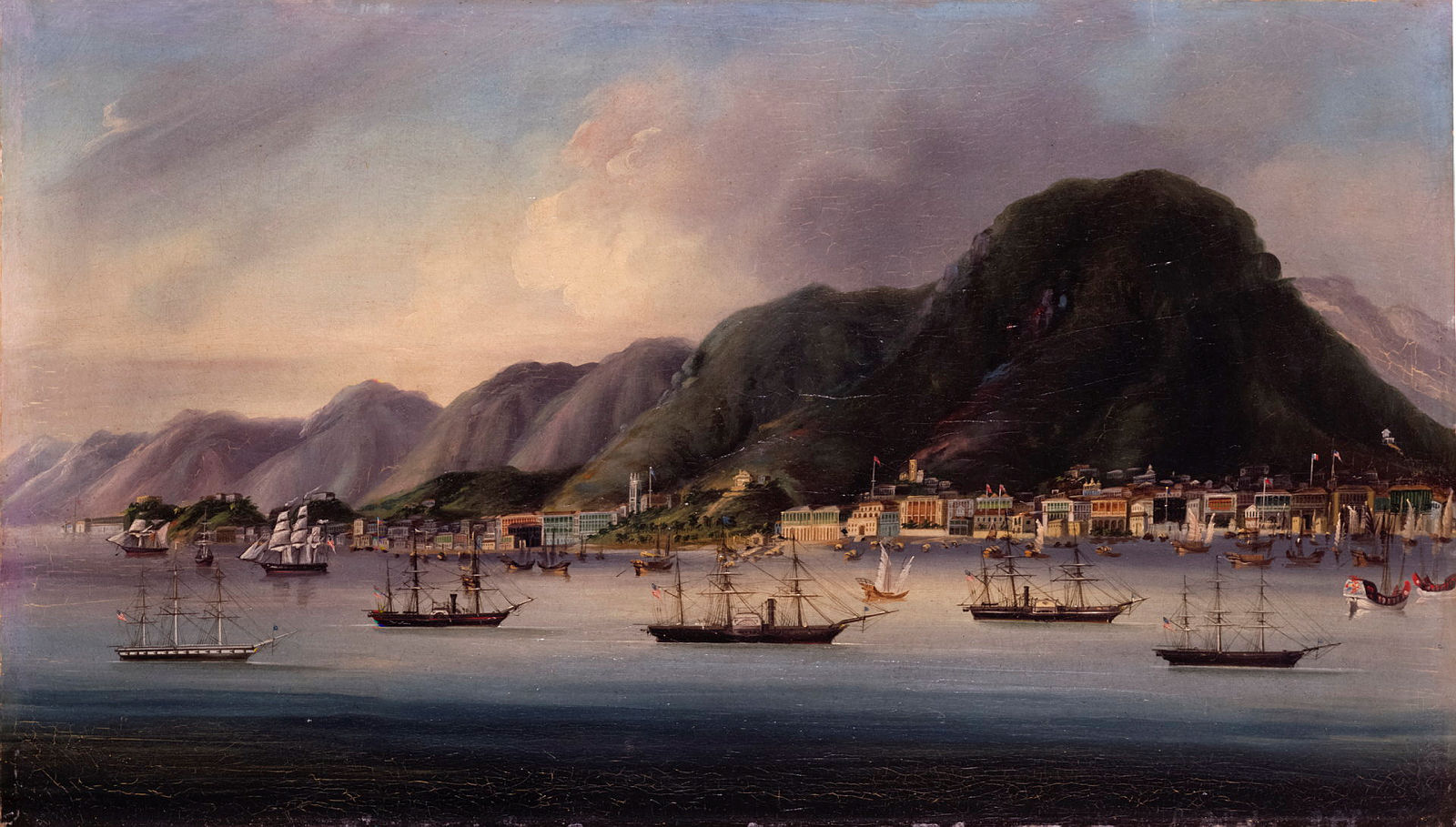
View of Hong Kong by Unknown, c. 1853

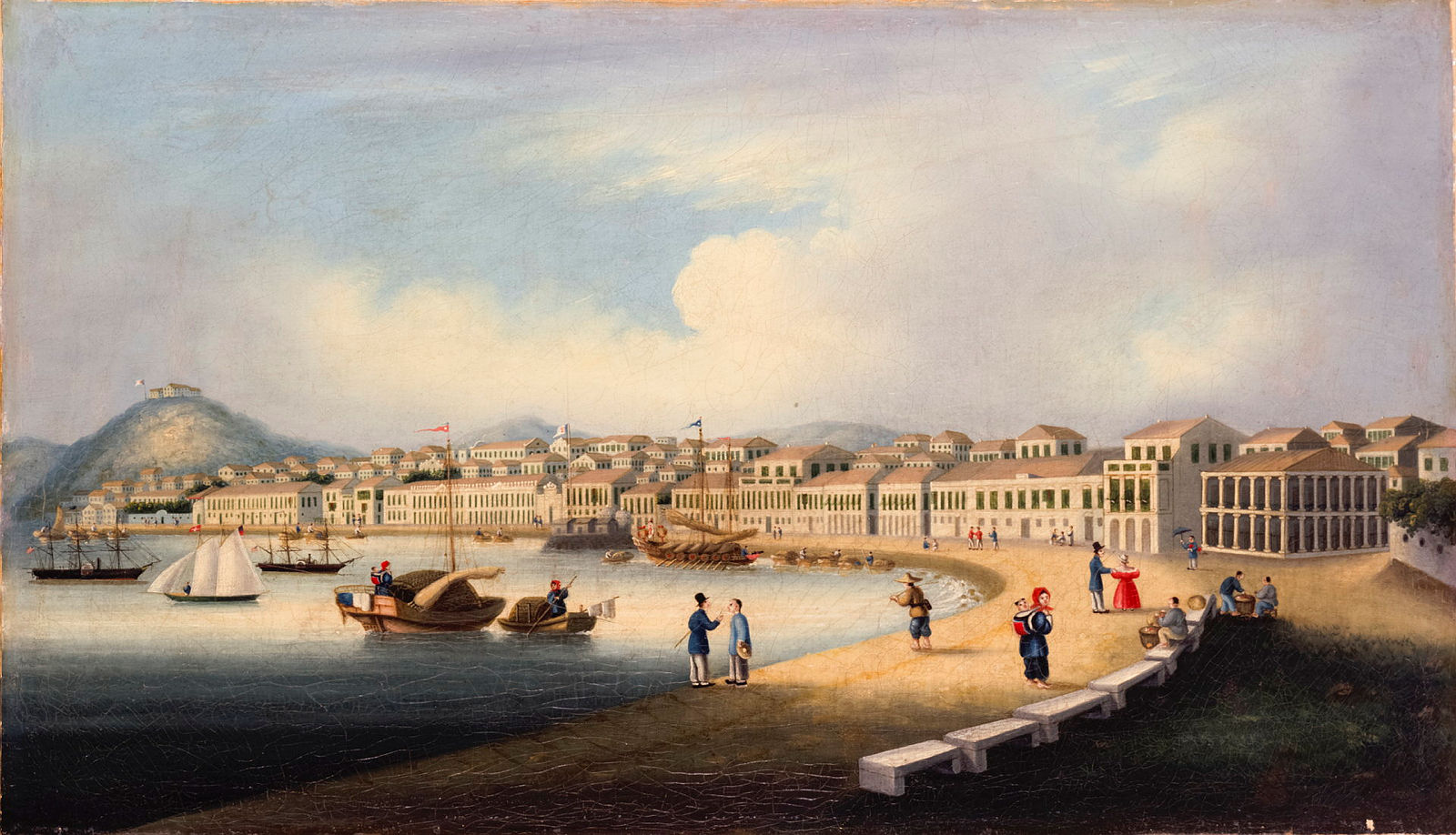
View of Macao by Unknown, c. 1853

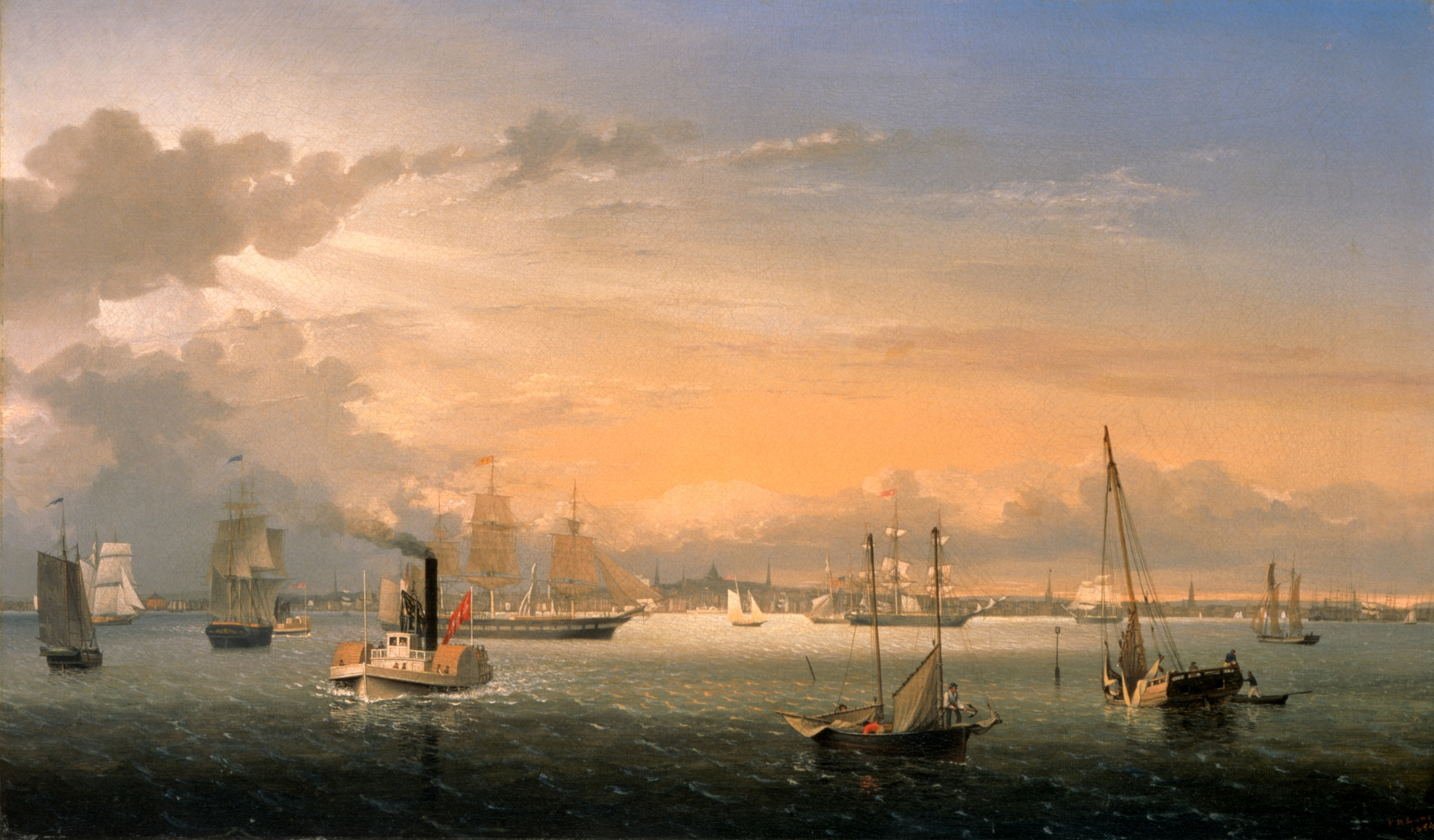
Boston Harbor by Fitz Hugh Lane, 1854

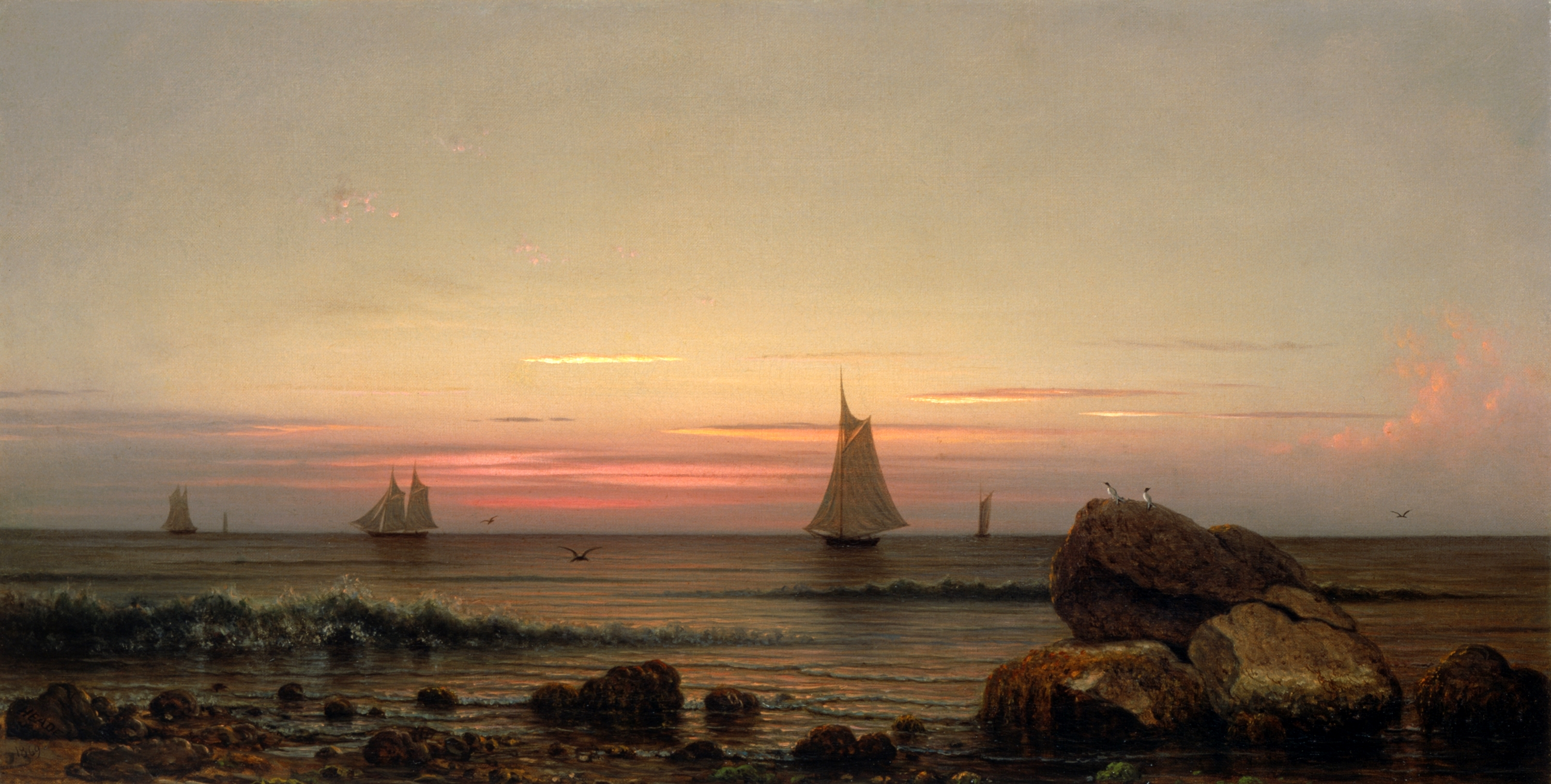
Sailing off the Coast by Martin Johnson Heade, 1869

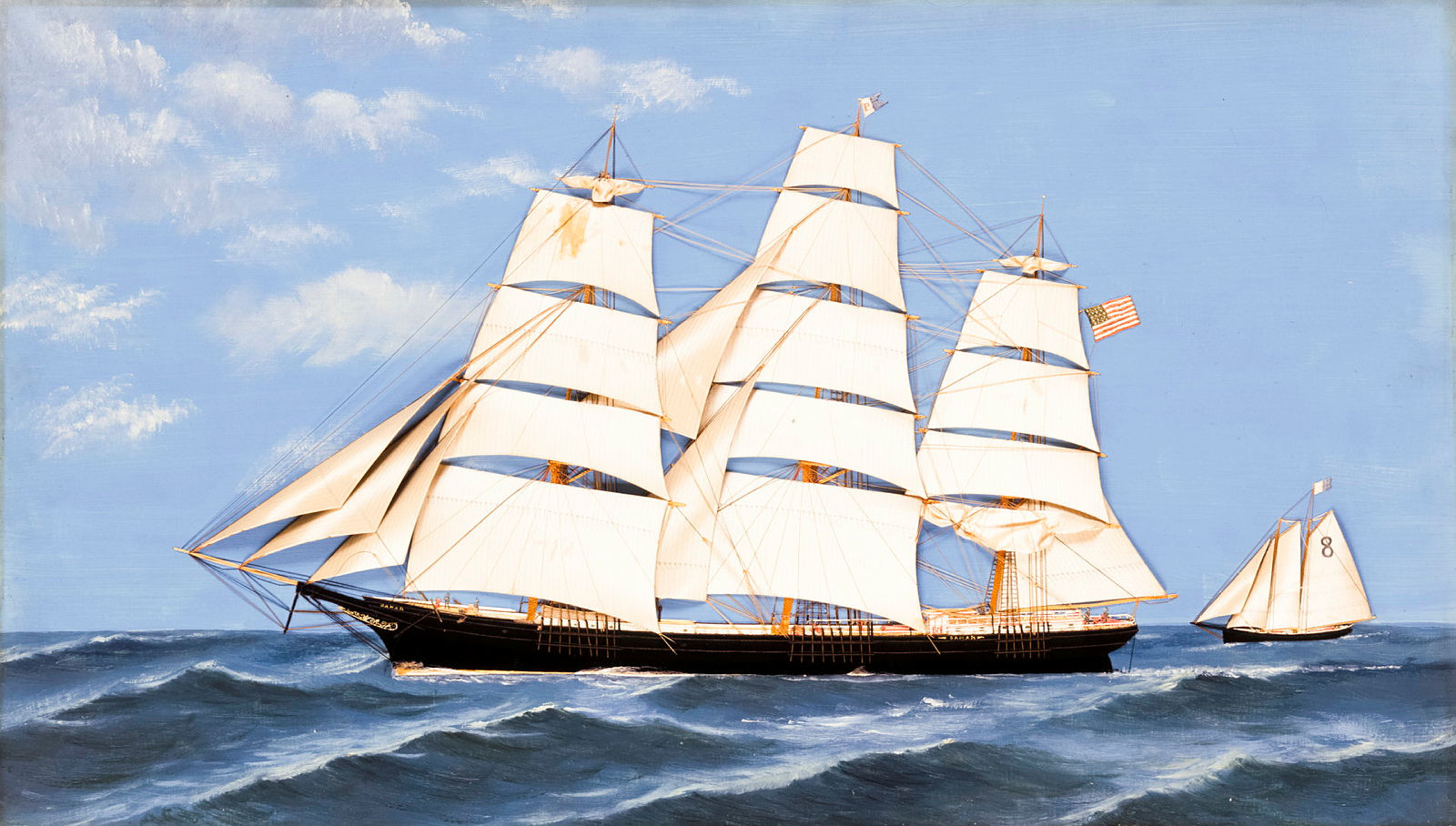
Three-Masted American Barque Samar by Unknown, 1875-1890

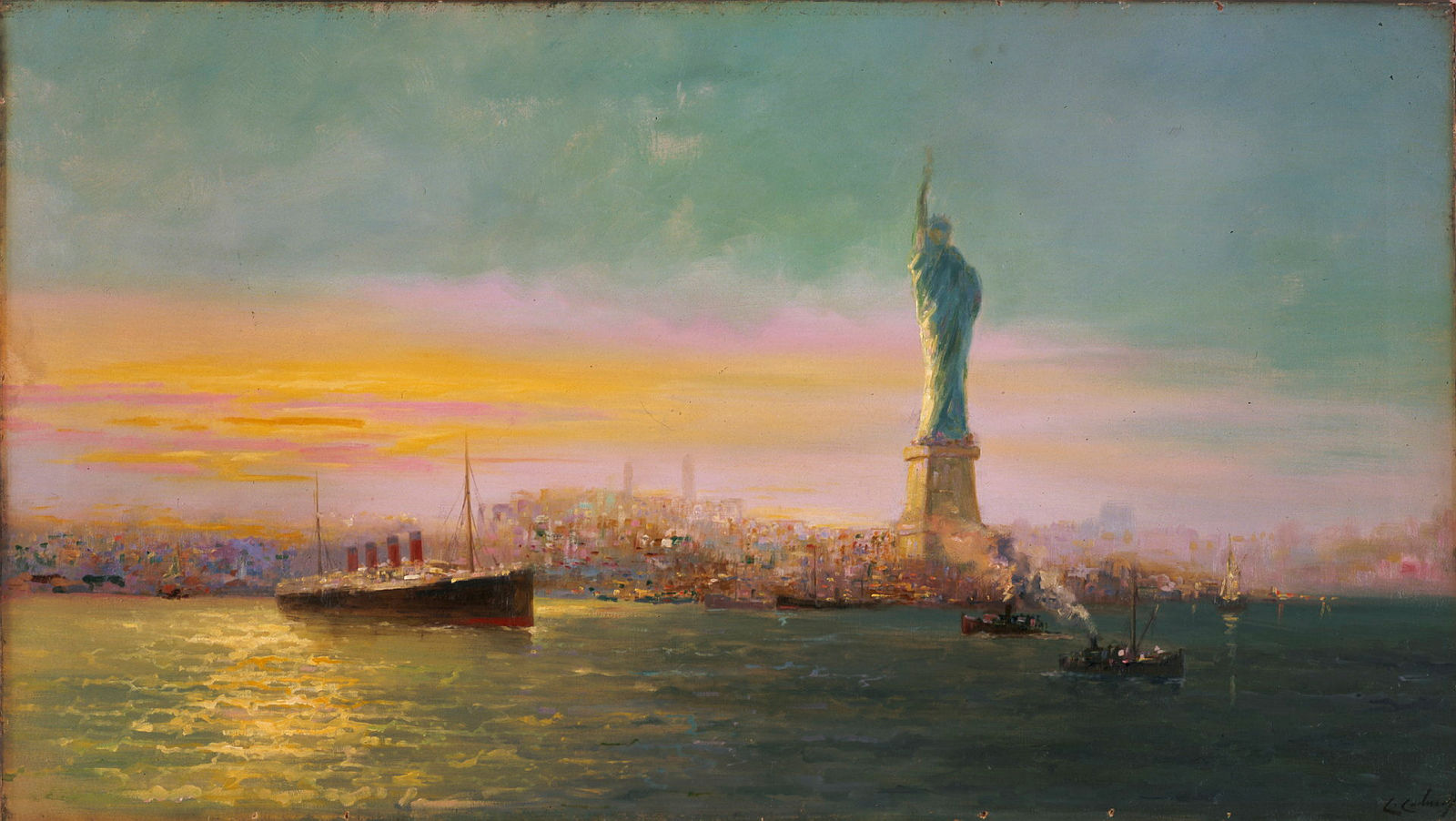
Welcome by Carl Calusd, c. 1900-1909

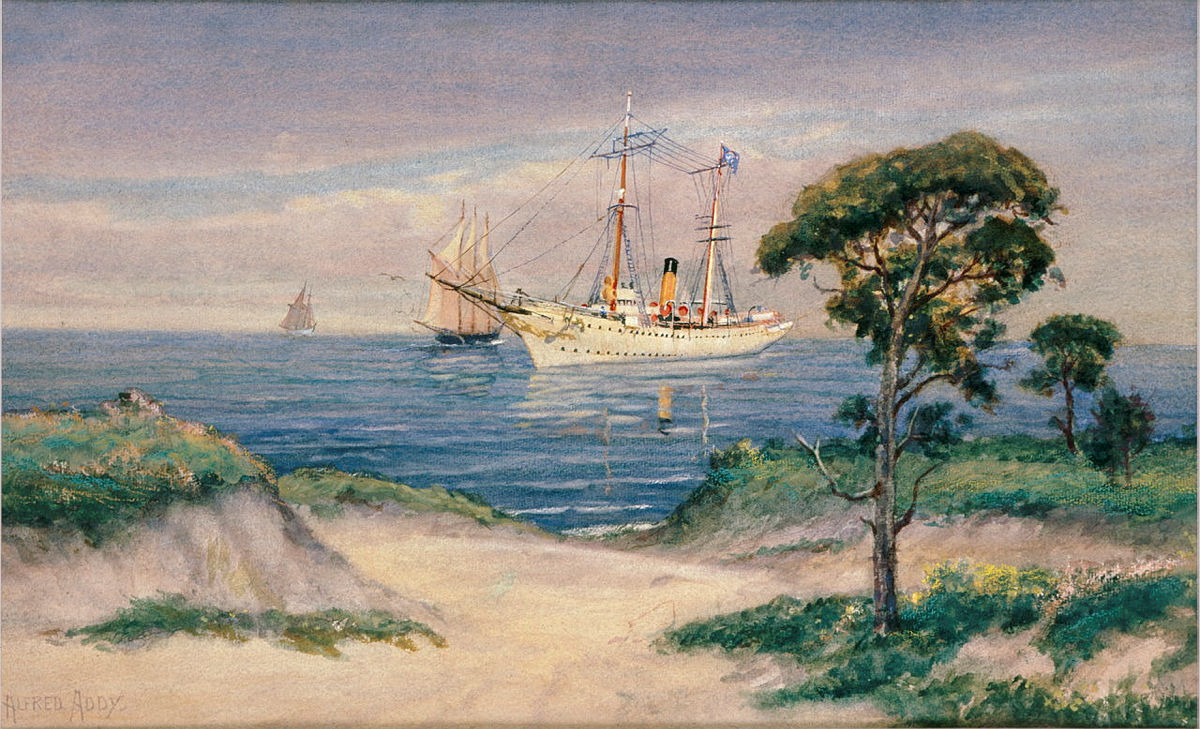
The Presidential Yacht Mayflower by Alfred Addy, c. 1902-1929

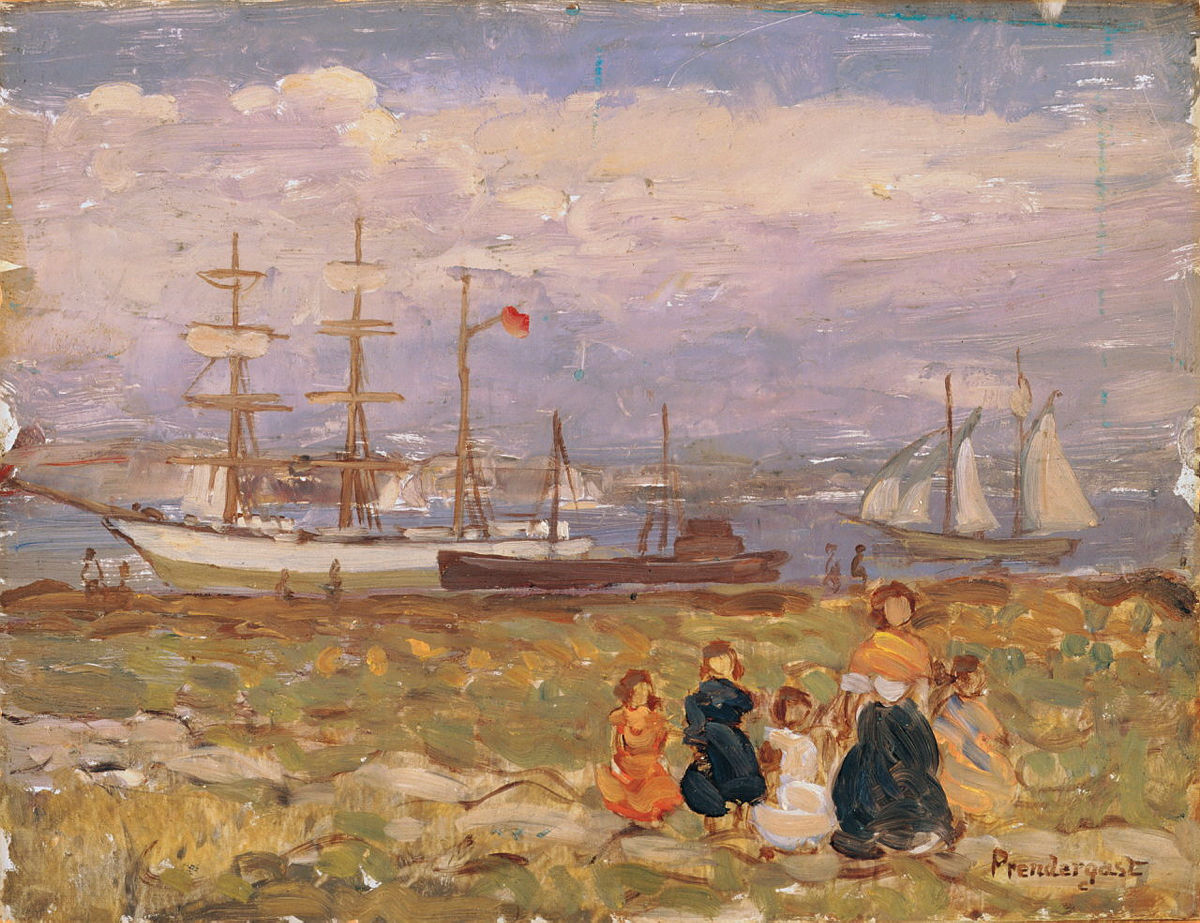
Boston Harbor by Maurice Prendergast, c. 1907-1910

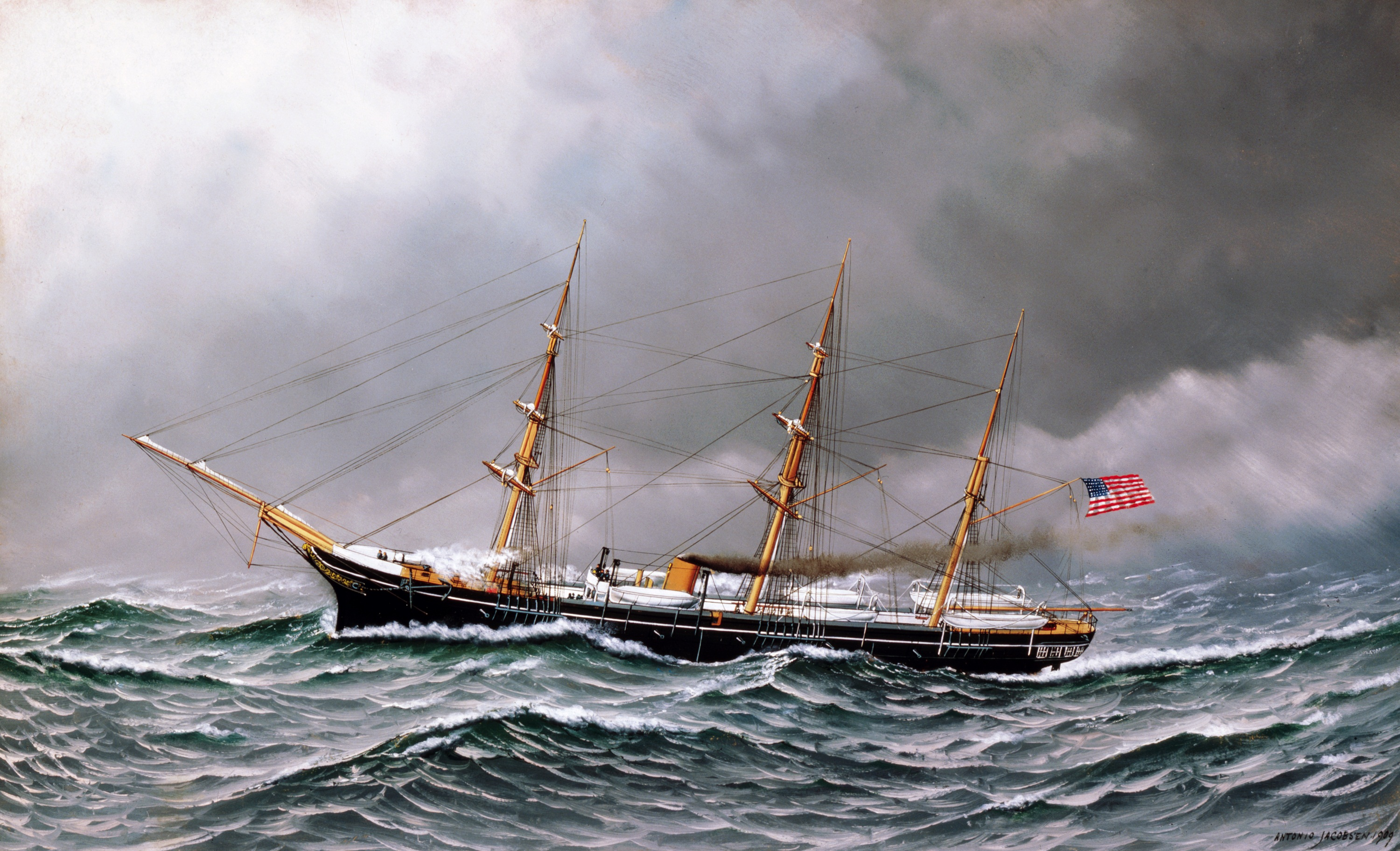
U.S.S. Galena by Antonio Jacobsen, 1909

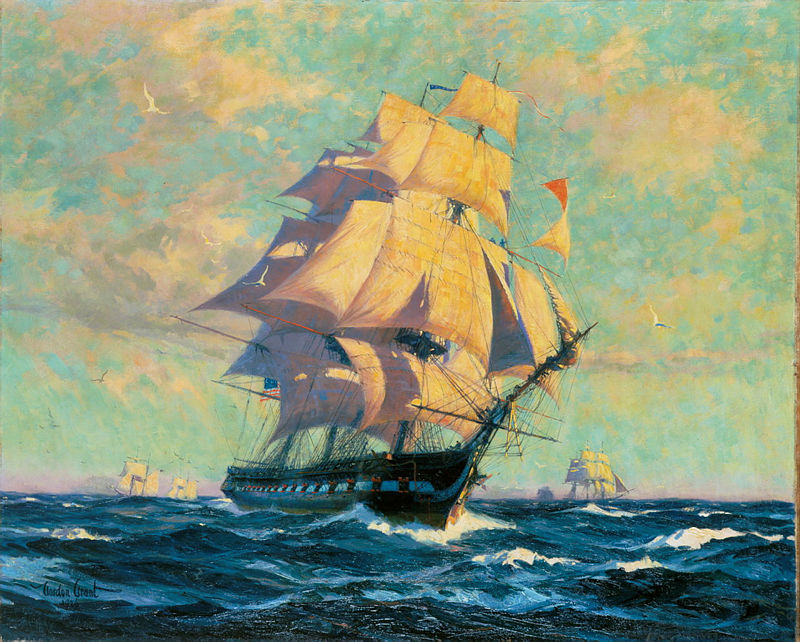
U.S.S. Constitution by Gordon Grant, 1926

=== Still life paintings ===
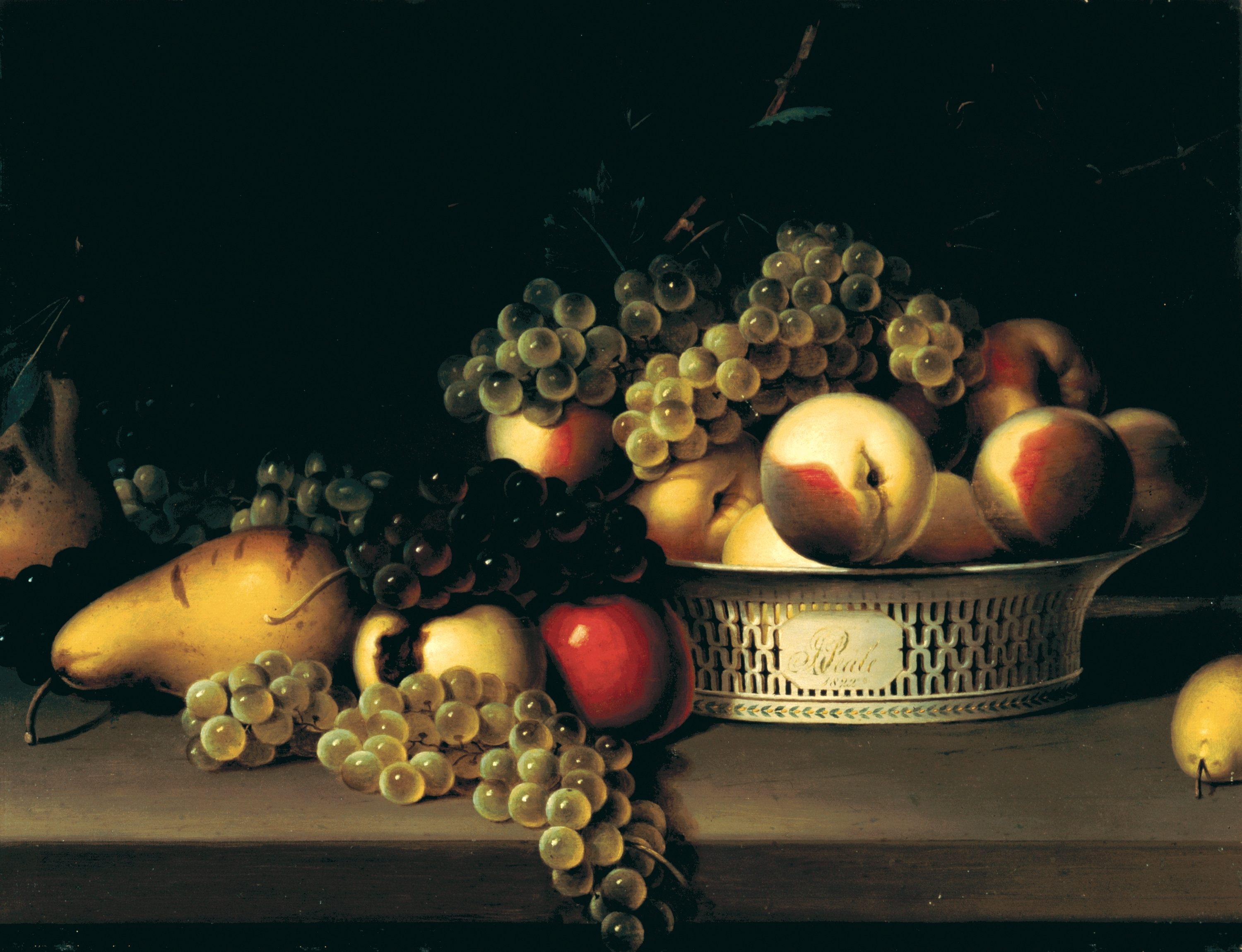
Fruit in a Chinese Export Basket by James Peale, 1822

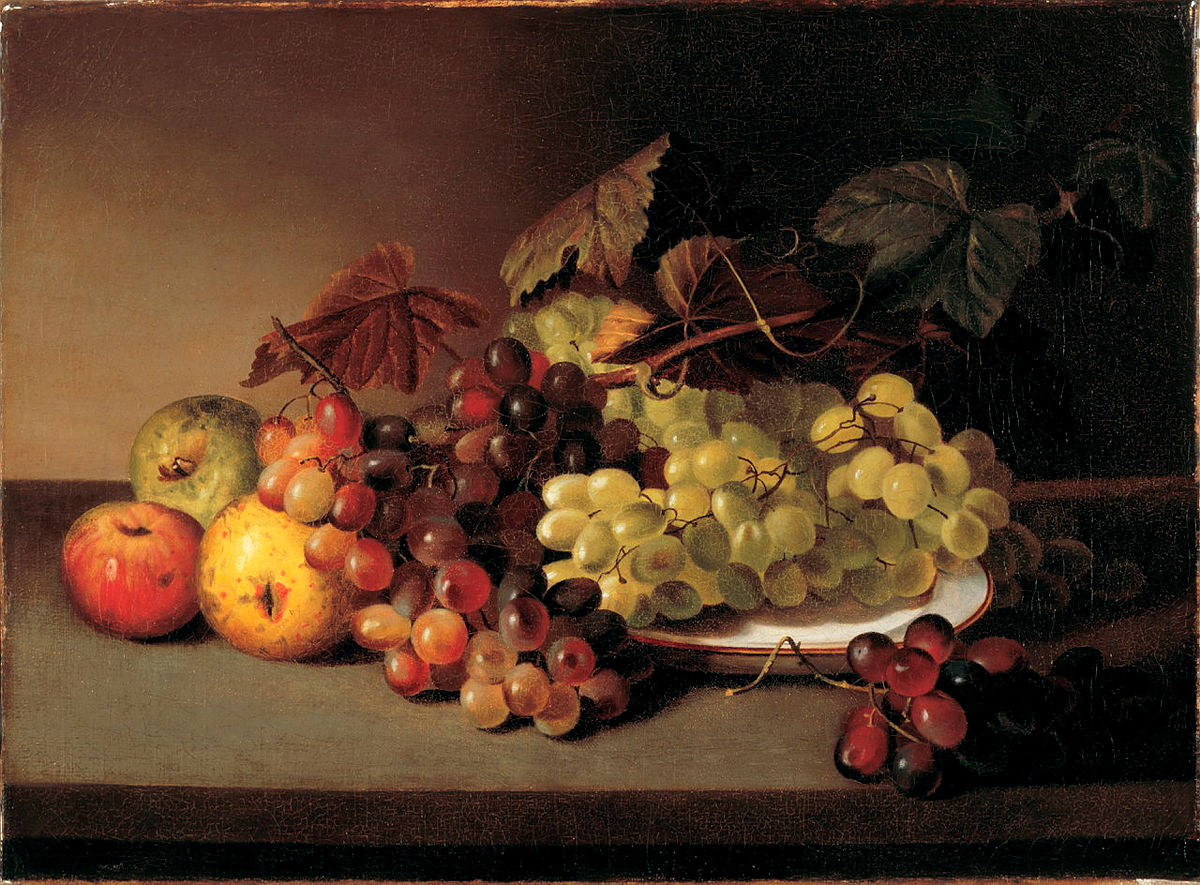
Grapes and Apples by James Peale, c. 1825-1831

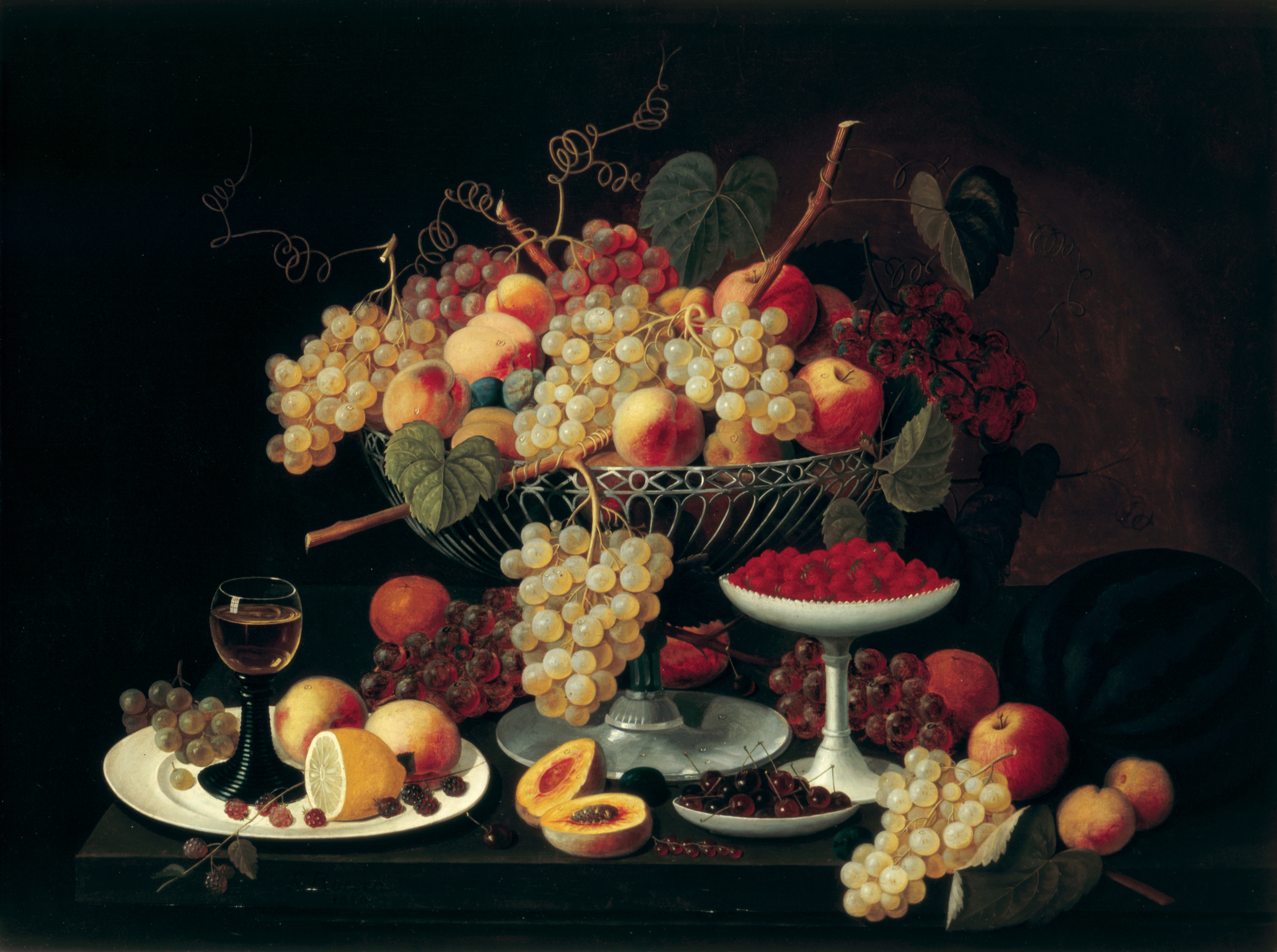
Still Life With Fruit by Severin Roesen, 1850

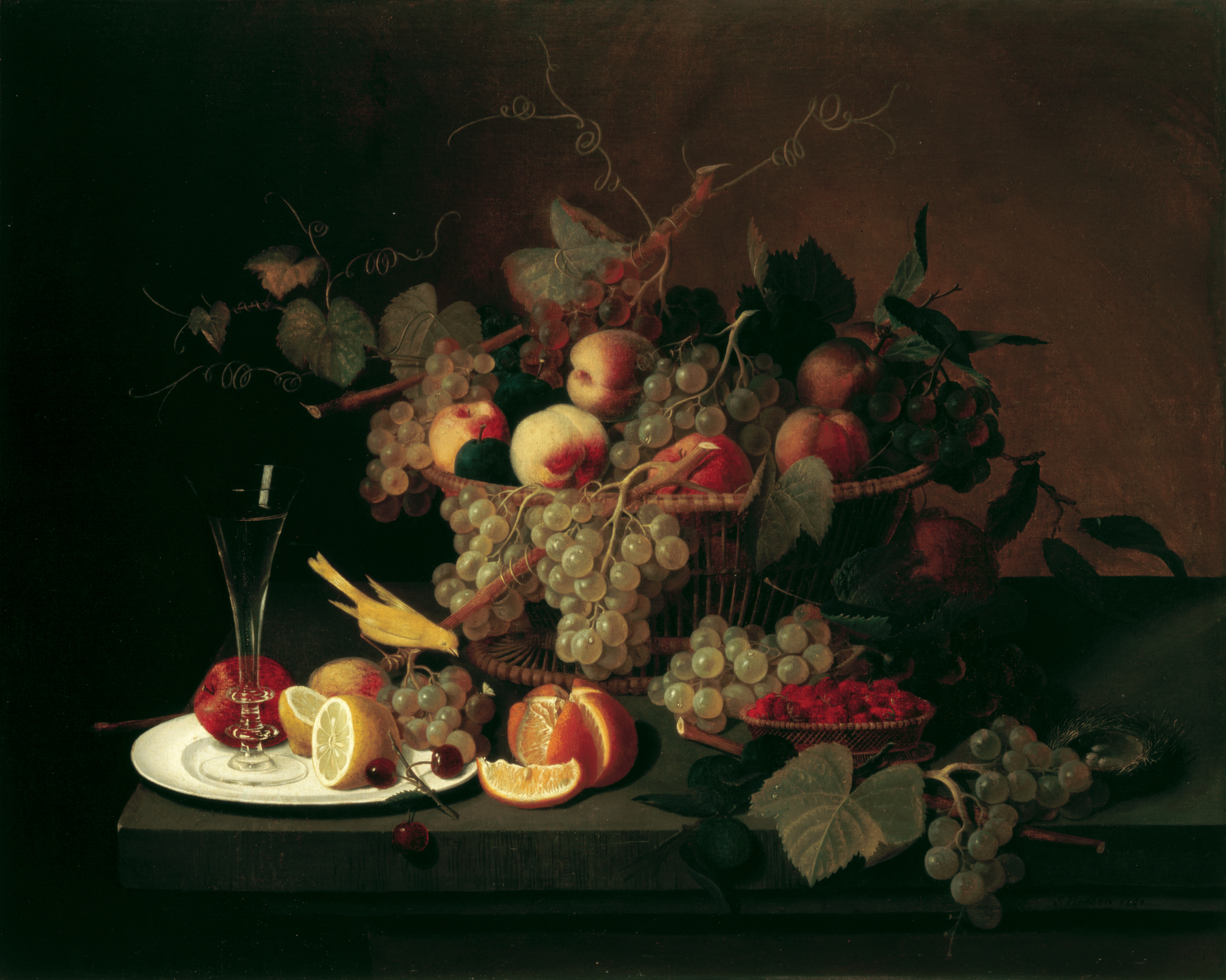
Still Life With Fruit, Goblet, and Canary (Nature's Bounty) by Severin Roesen, 1851

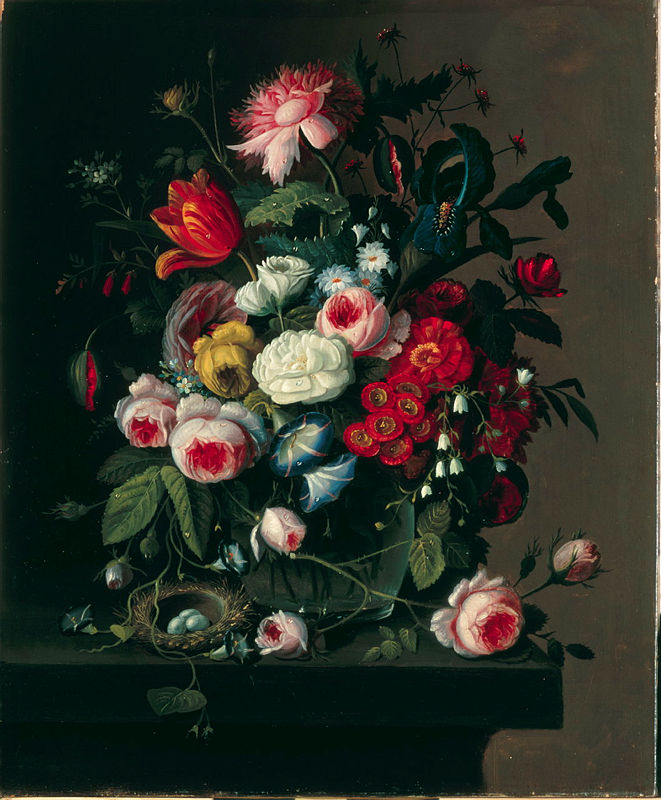
Floral Still Life with Nest of Eggs by Severin Roesen, c. 1851−1852

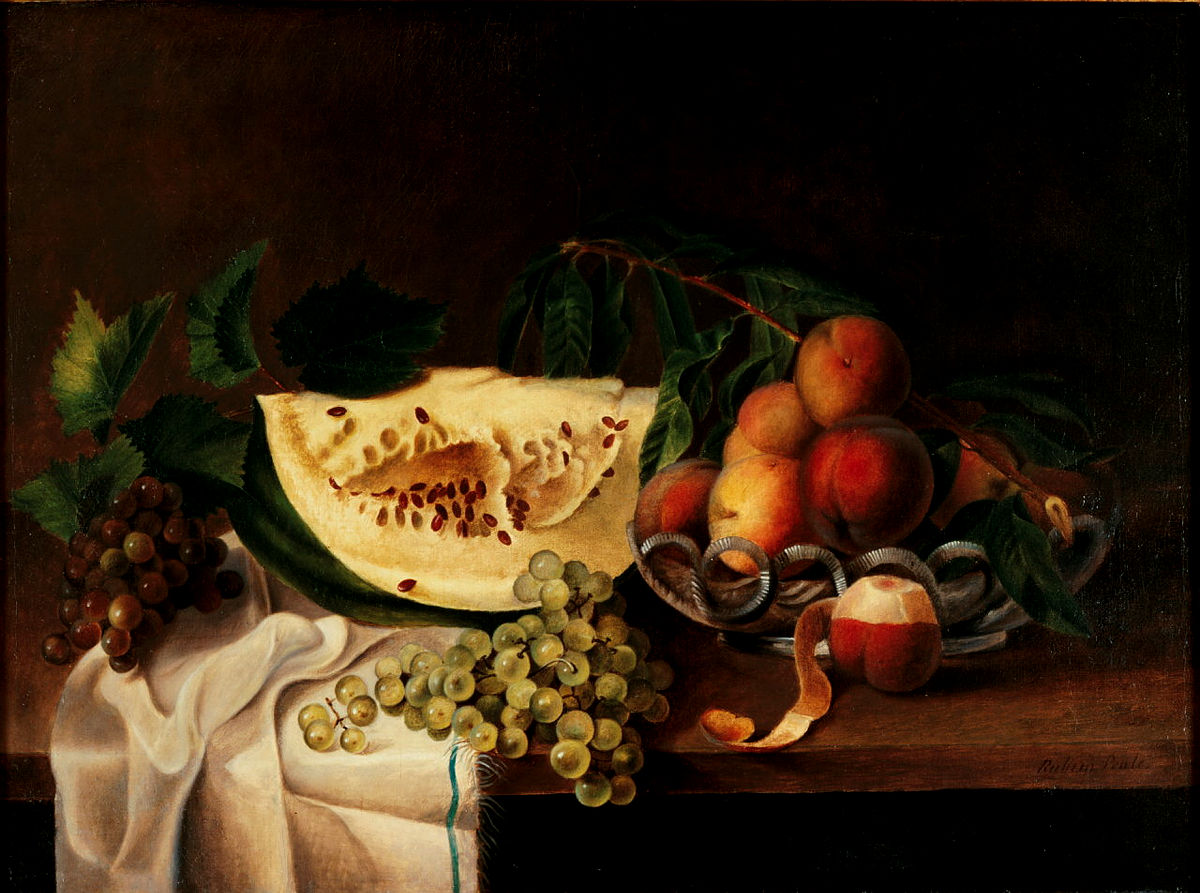
Still Life with Fruit by Rubens Peale, c. 1862

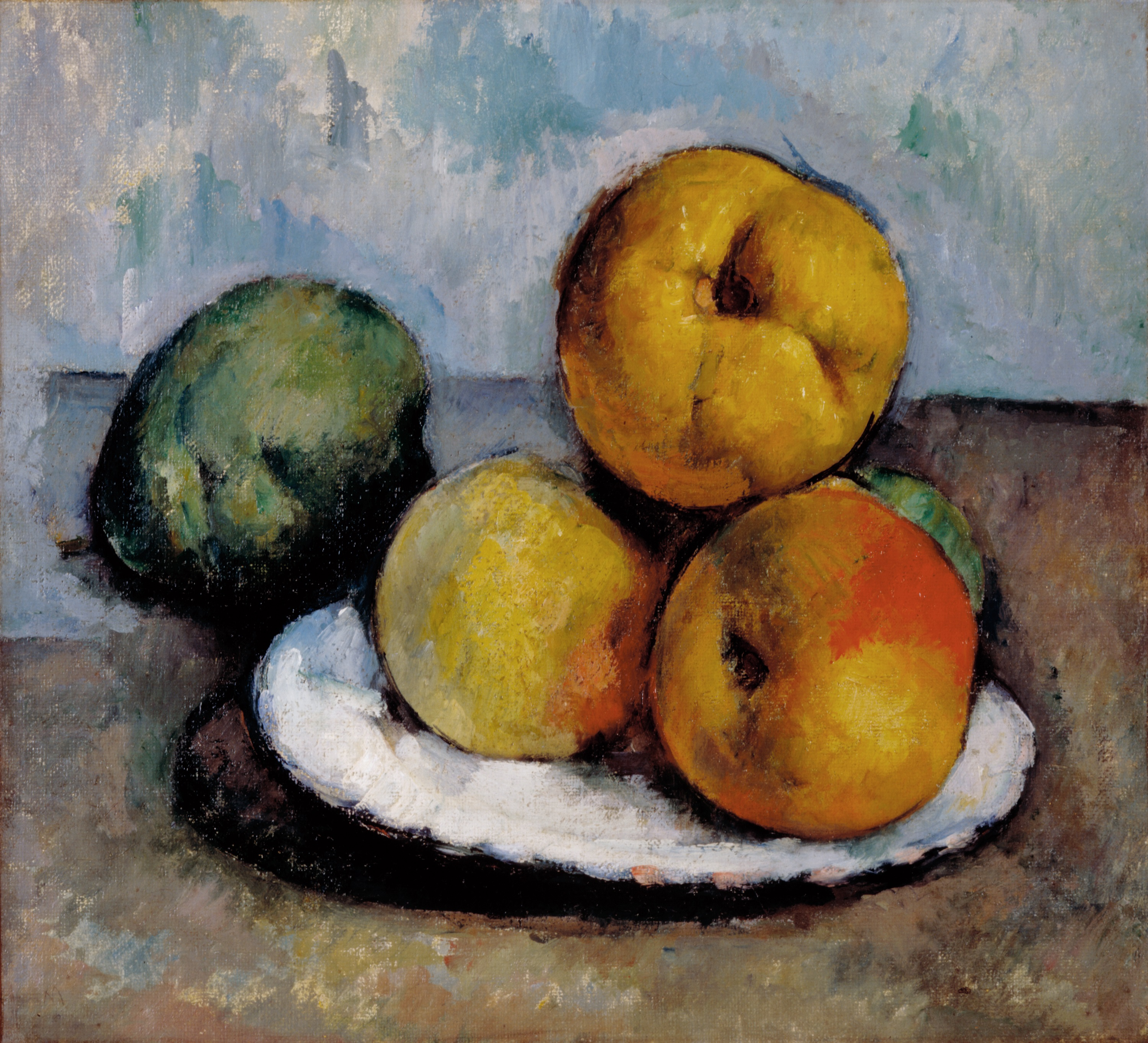
Still Life With Quince, Apples, and Pears by Paul Cézanne, c. 1885-1887

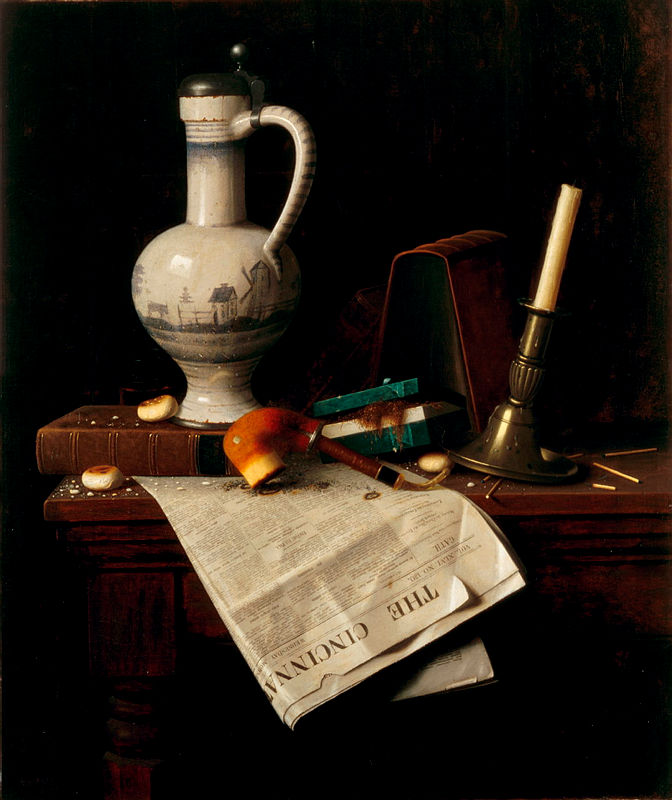
The Cincinnati Enquirer by William Michael Harnett, 1888

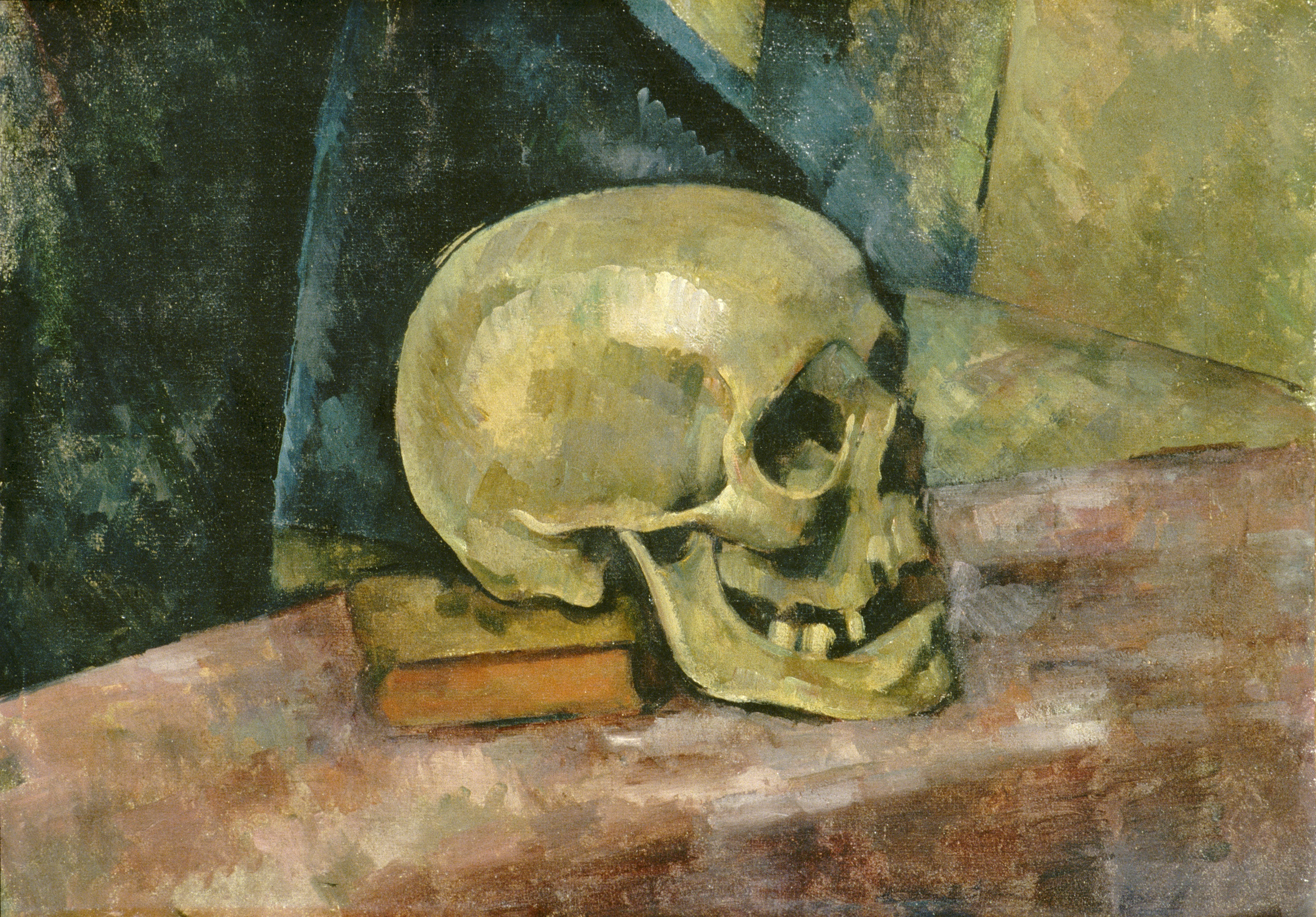
Still Life With Skull by Paul Cézanne, c. 1900

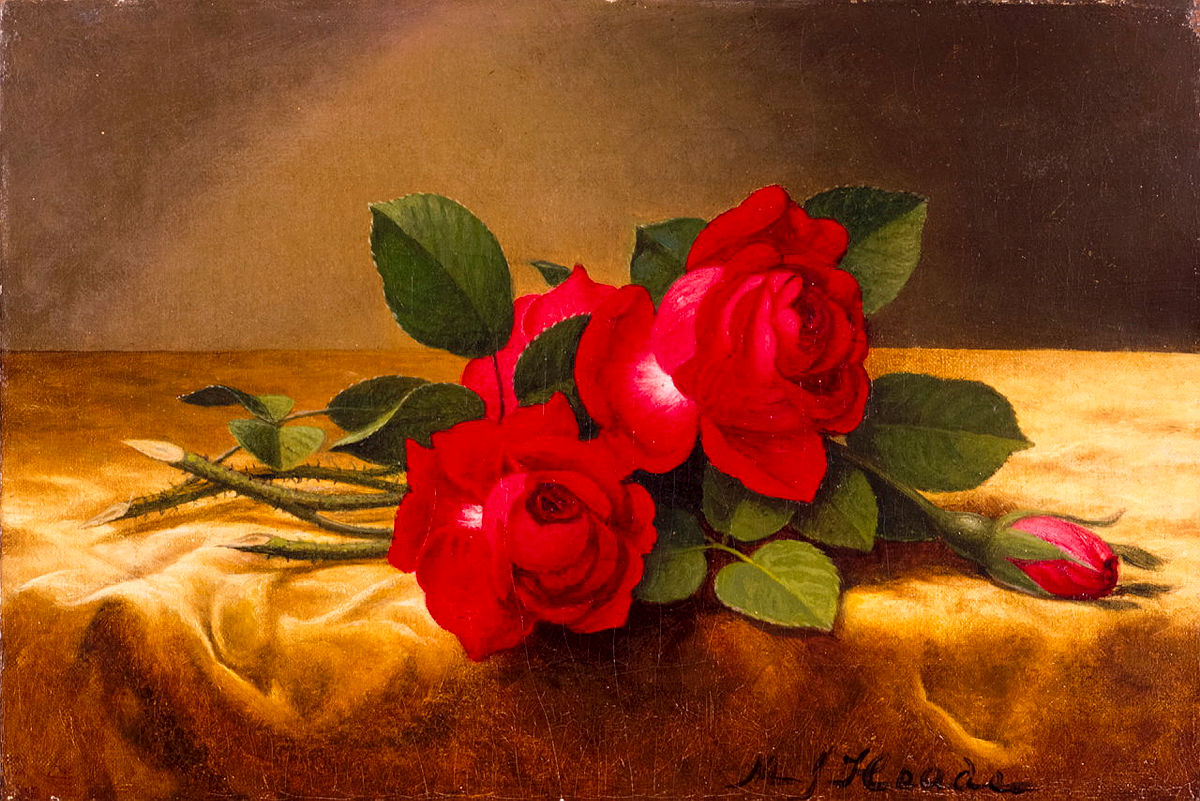
Red Roses and Green Leaves by Martin Johnson Heade, c. 1903

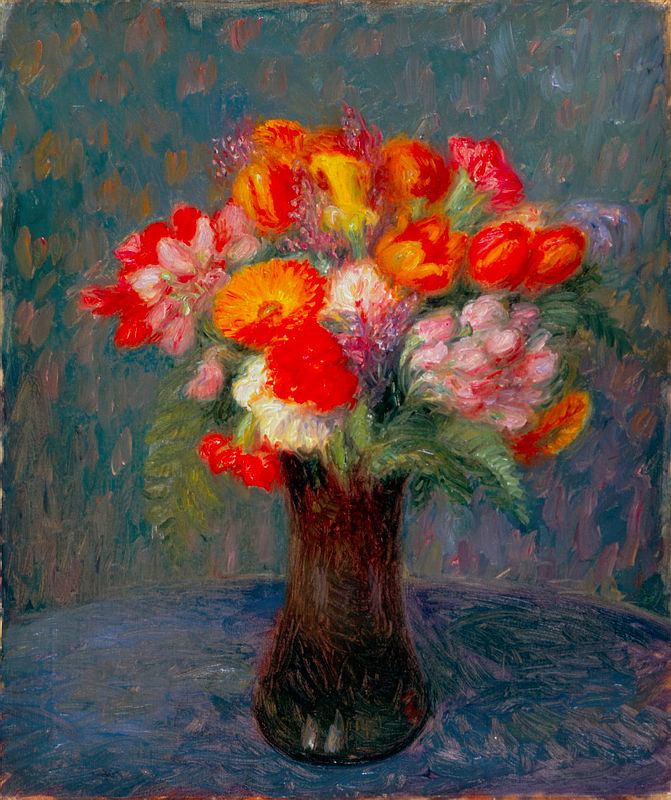
Bouquet with Ferns by William James Glackens, c. 1920-1925

=== Historical and genre paintings ===
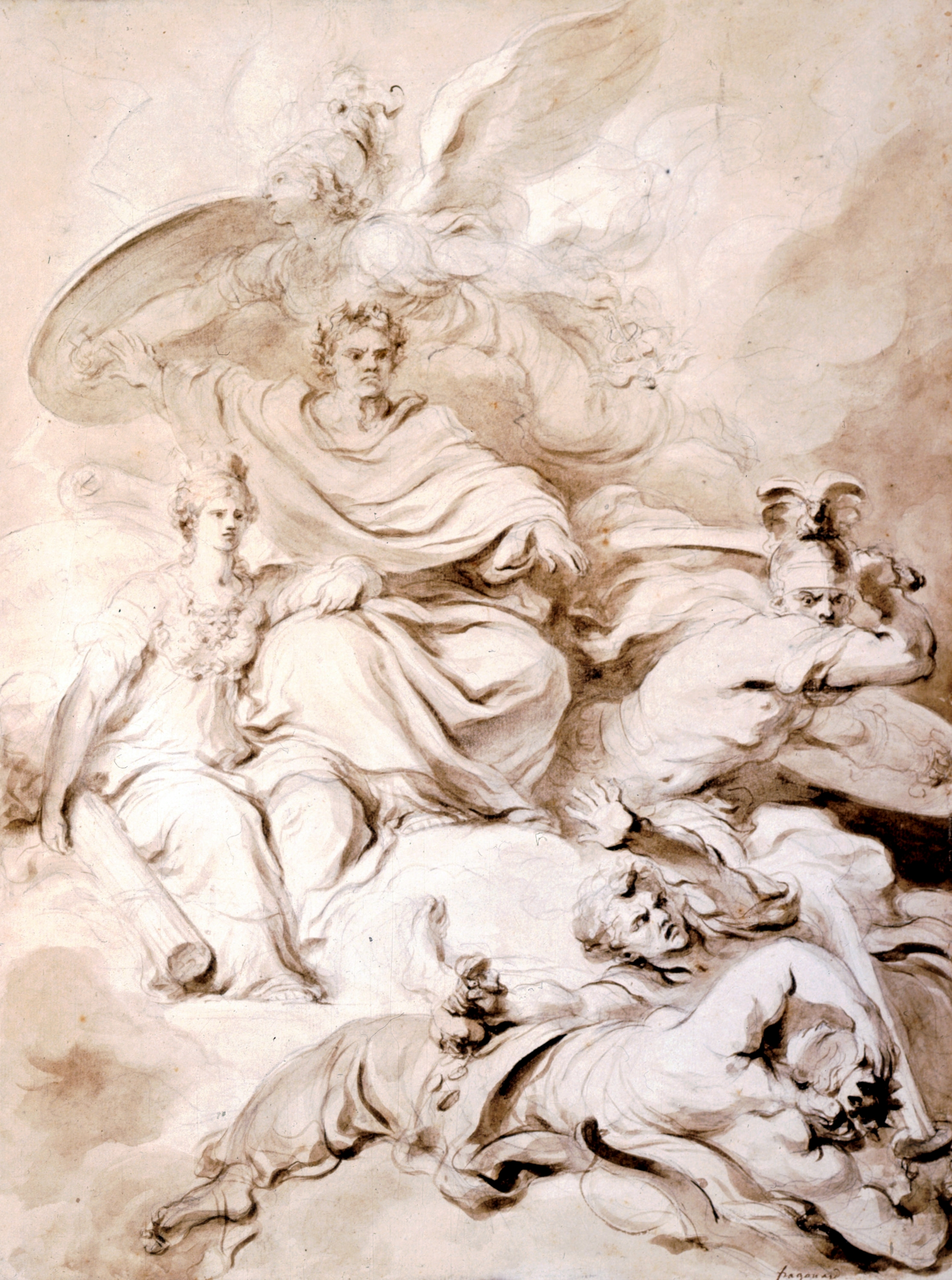
To the Genius of Franklin by Jean-Honoré Fragonard, c. 1778

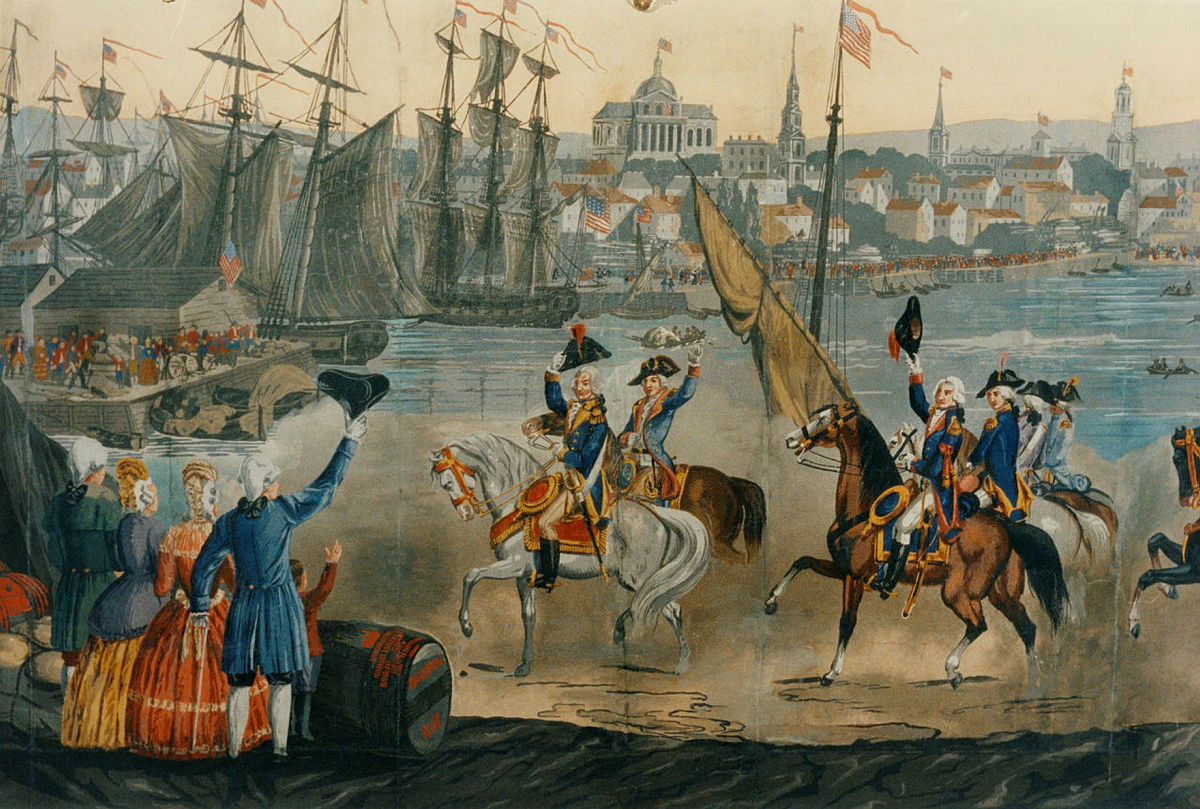
George Washington Triumphantly Entering Boston by Unknown, c. 1834

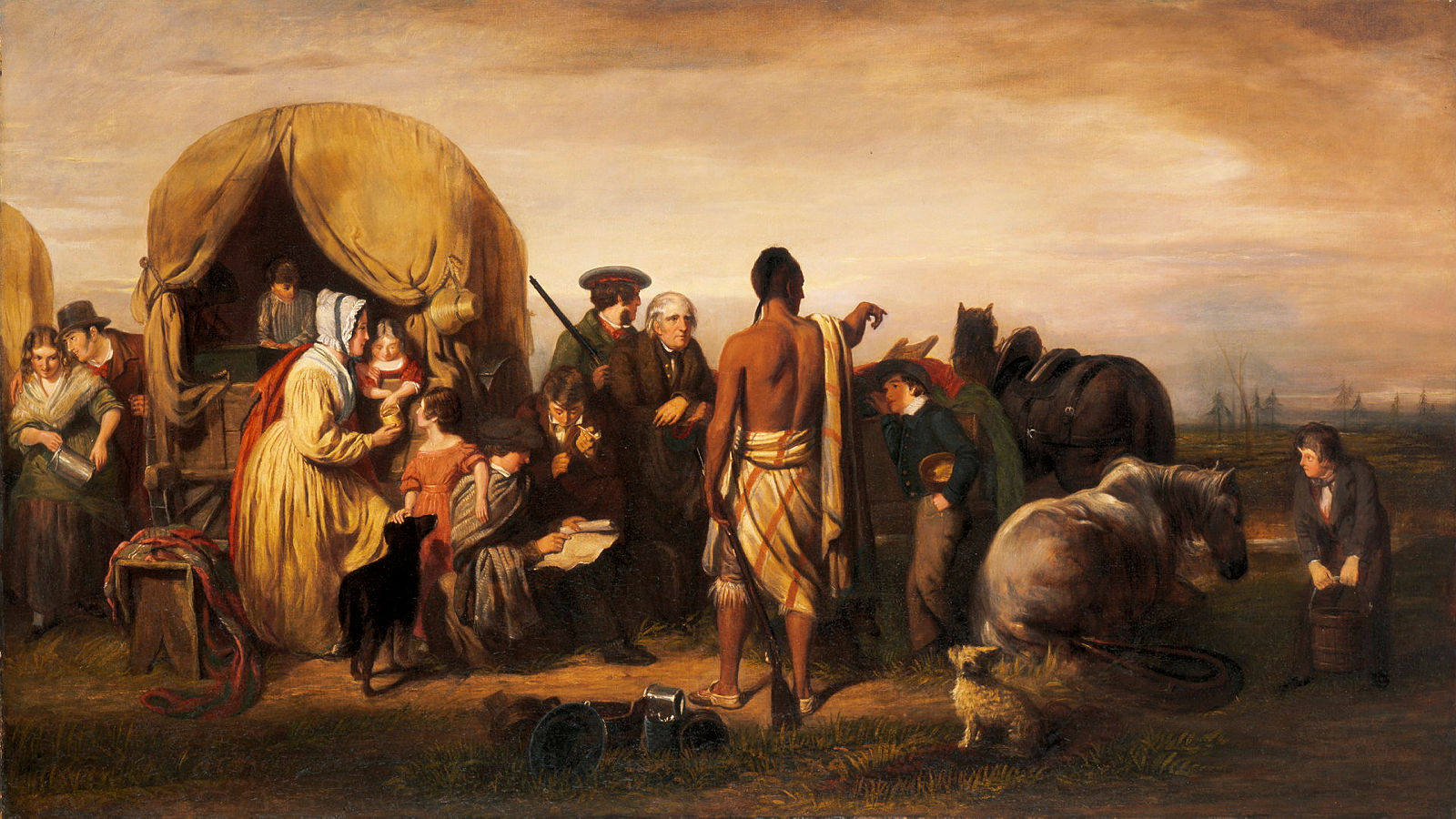
Emigrant Scene by William Henry Powell, 1837

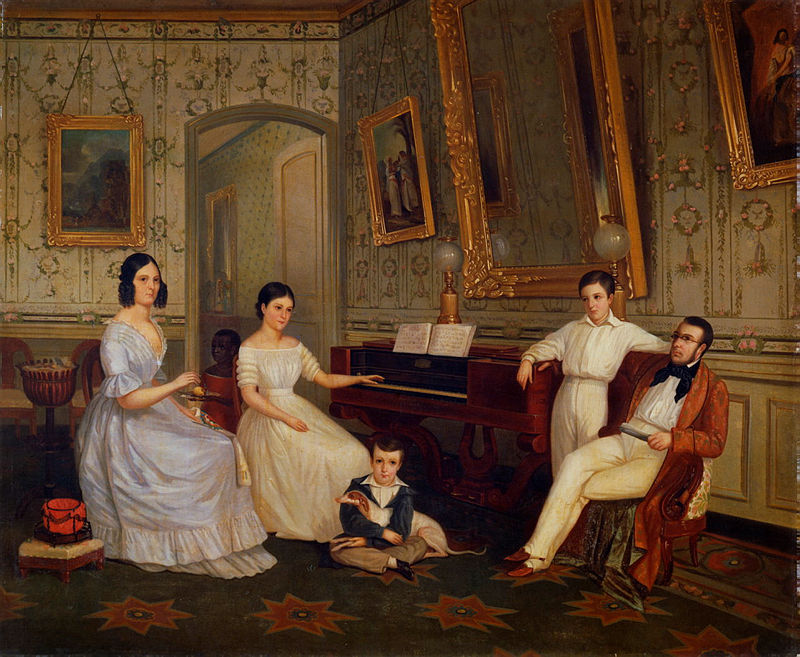
A Hartford Family by Unknown, c. 1840-1850

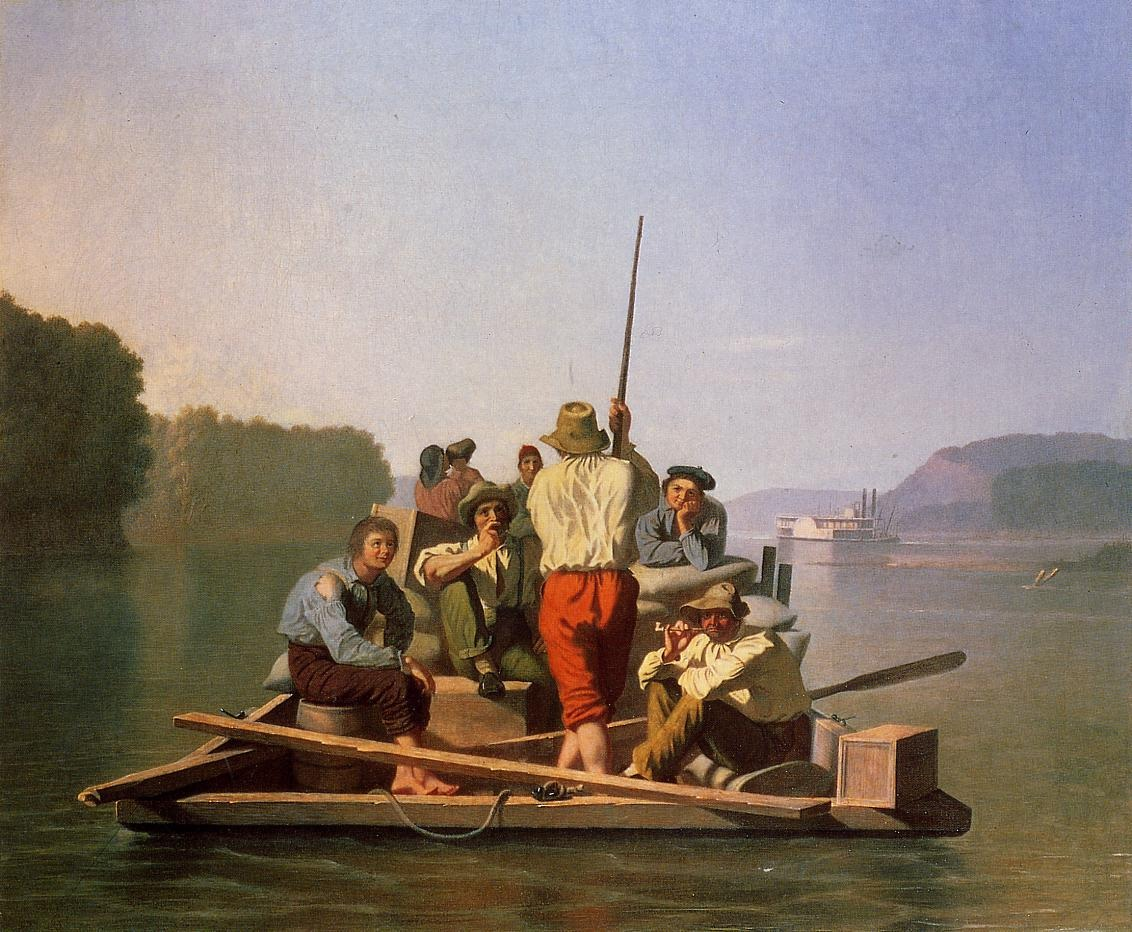
Lighter Relieving the Steamboat Aground by George Caleb Bingham, 1847

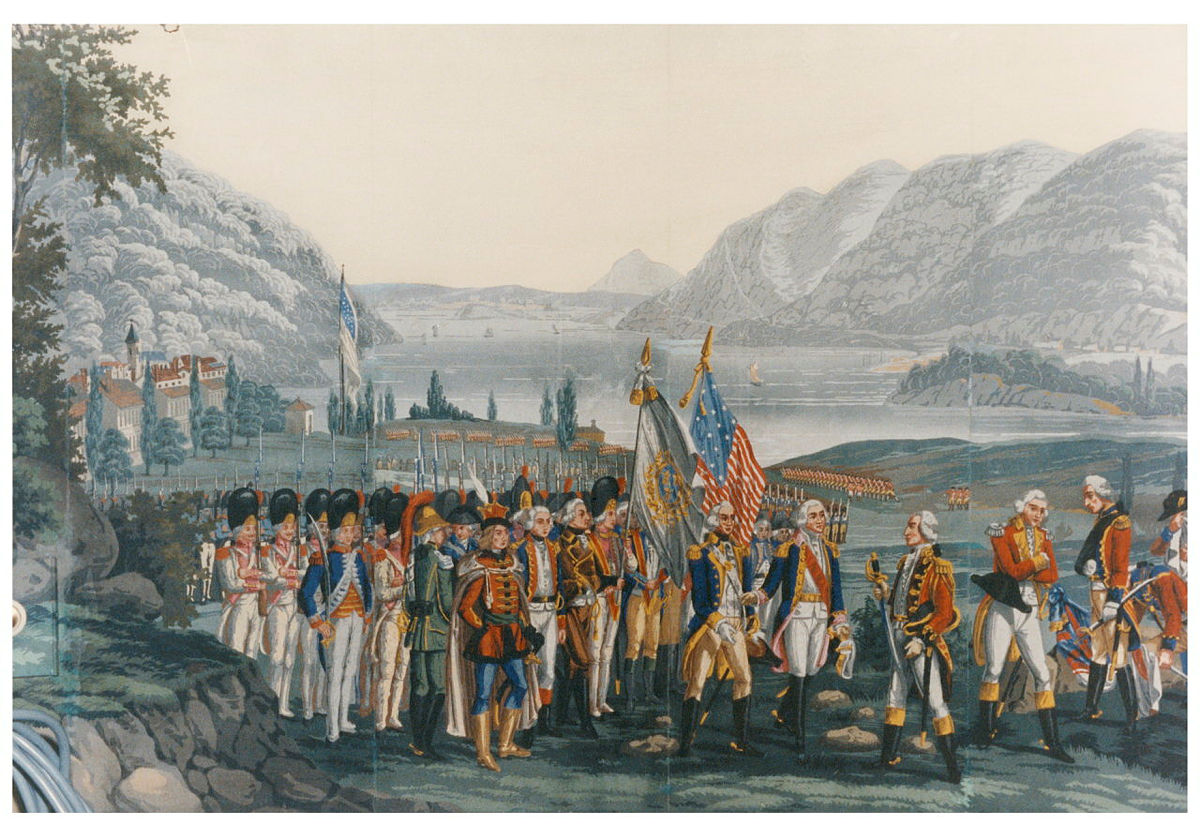
George Washington Accepts the Surrender of British General Cornwallis by Jean Zuber et Cie, c. 1850

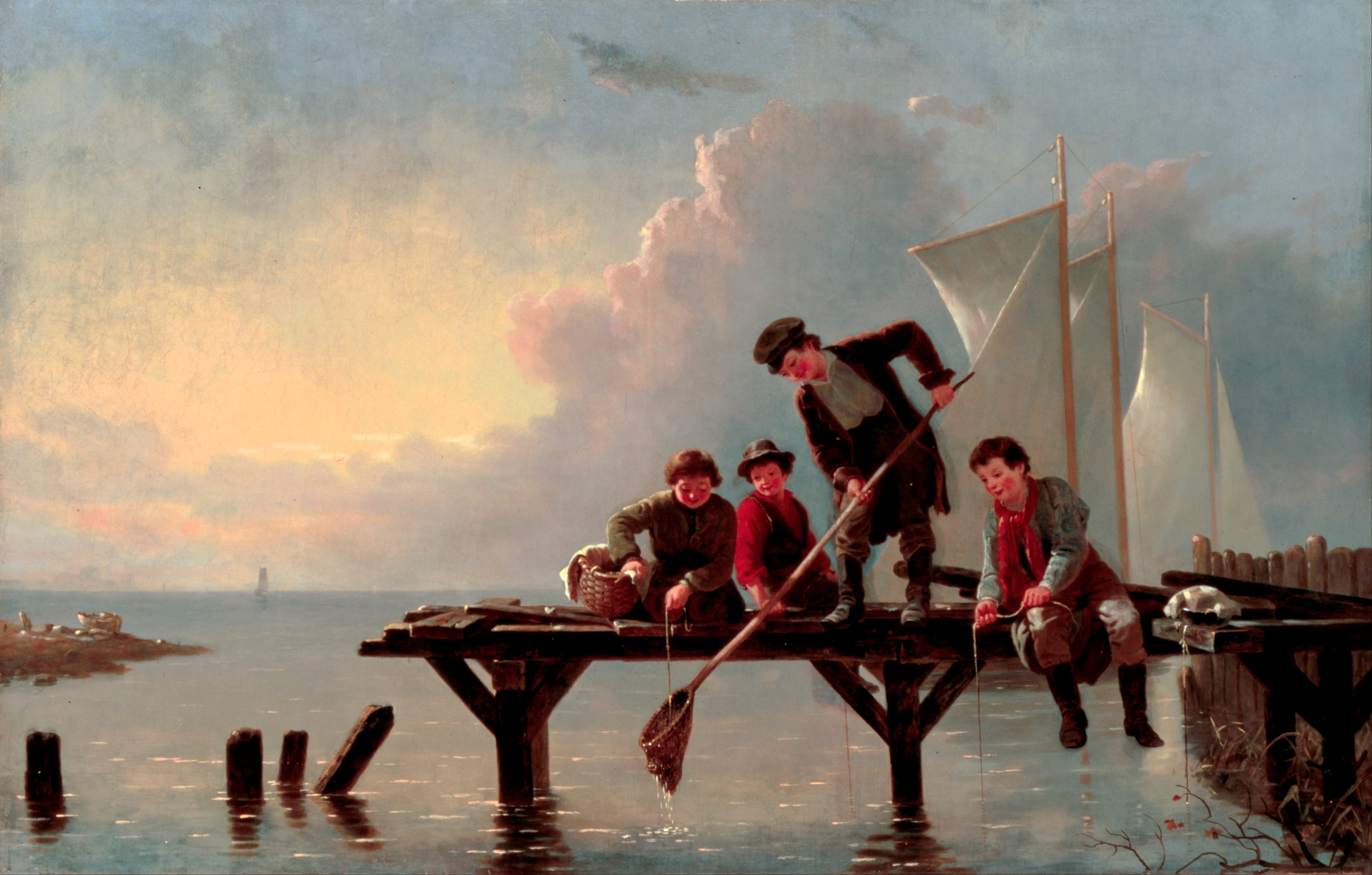
Boys Crabbing by William Ranney, 1855

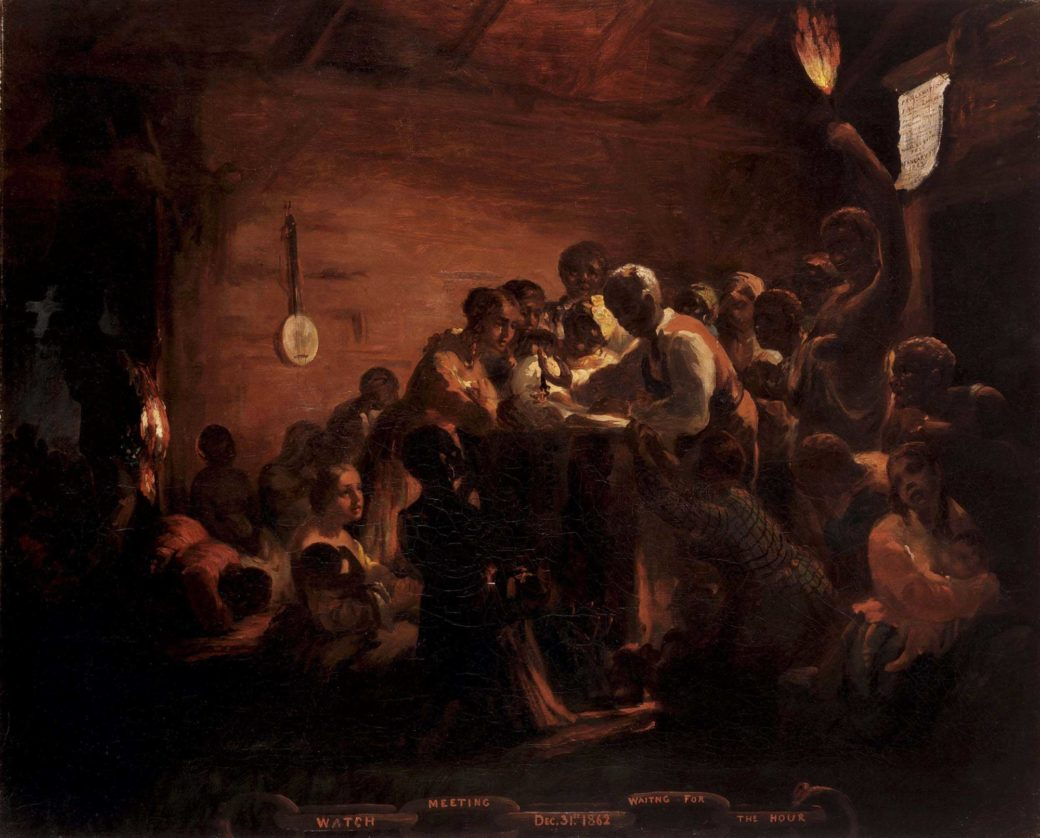
Waiting for the Hour by William Tolman Carlton, 1863

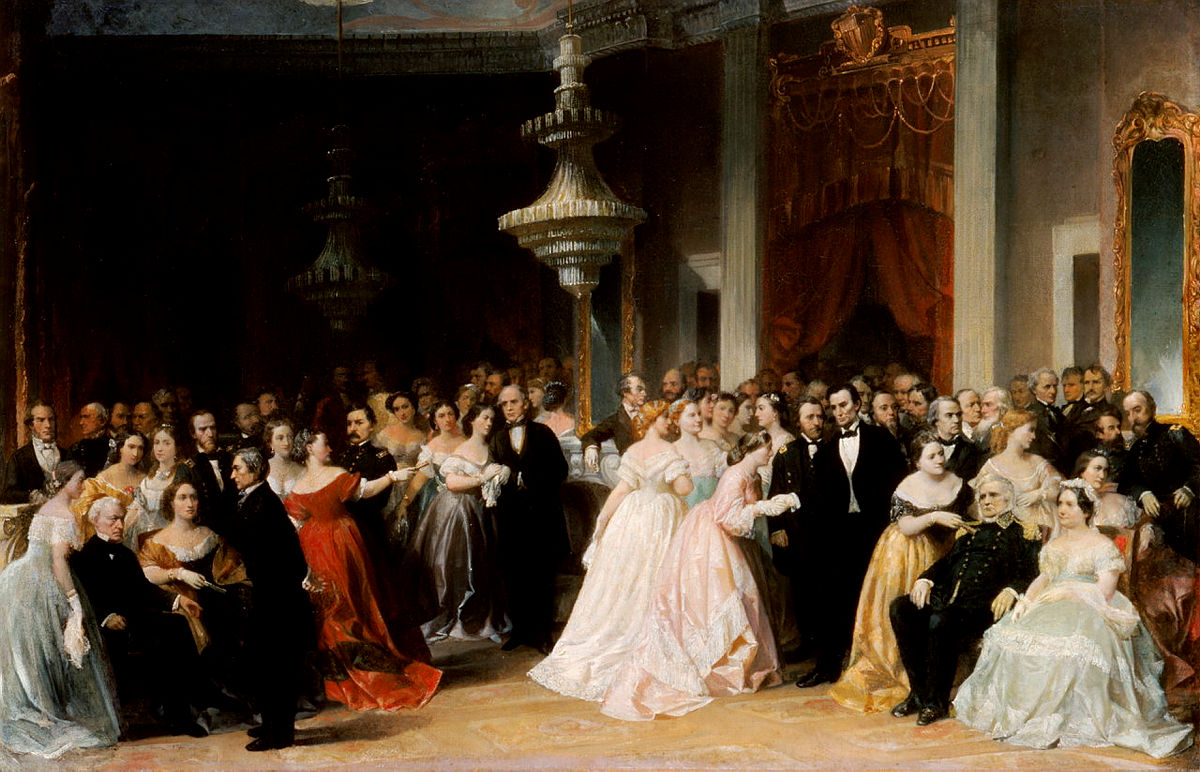
The Republican Court in the Days of Lincoln by Peter Frederick Rothermel, c. 1867

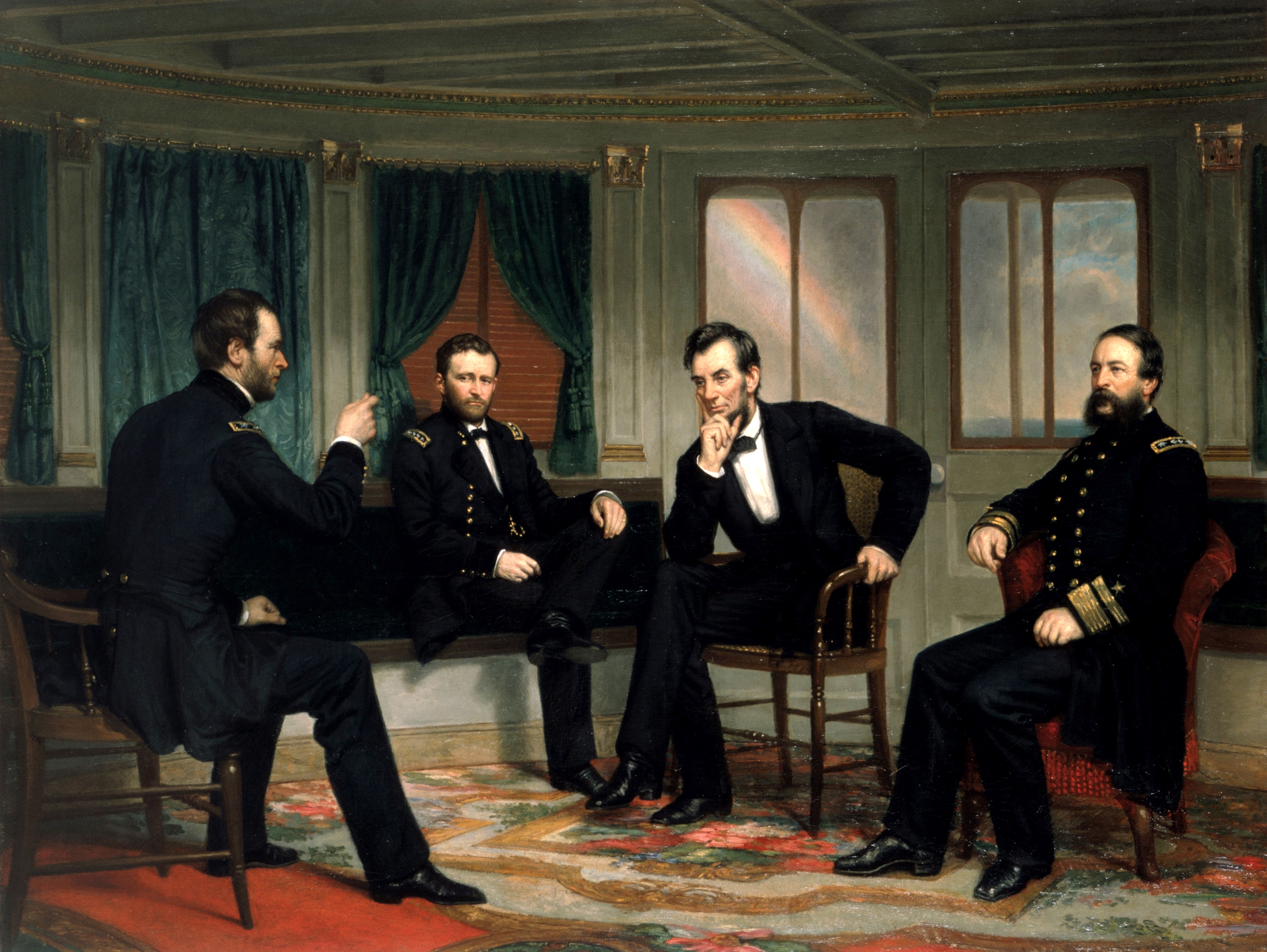
The Peacemakers by George P.A. Healy, 1868

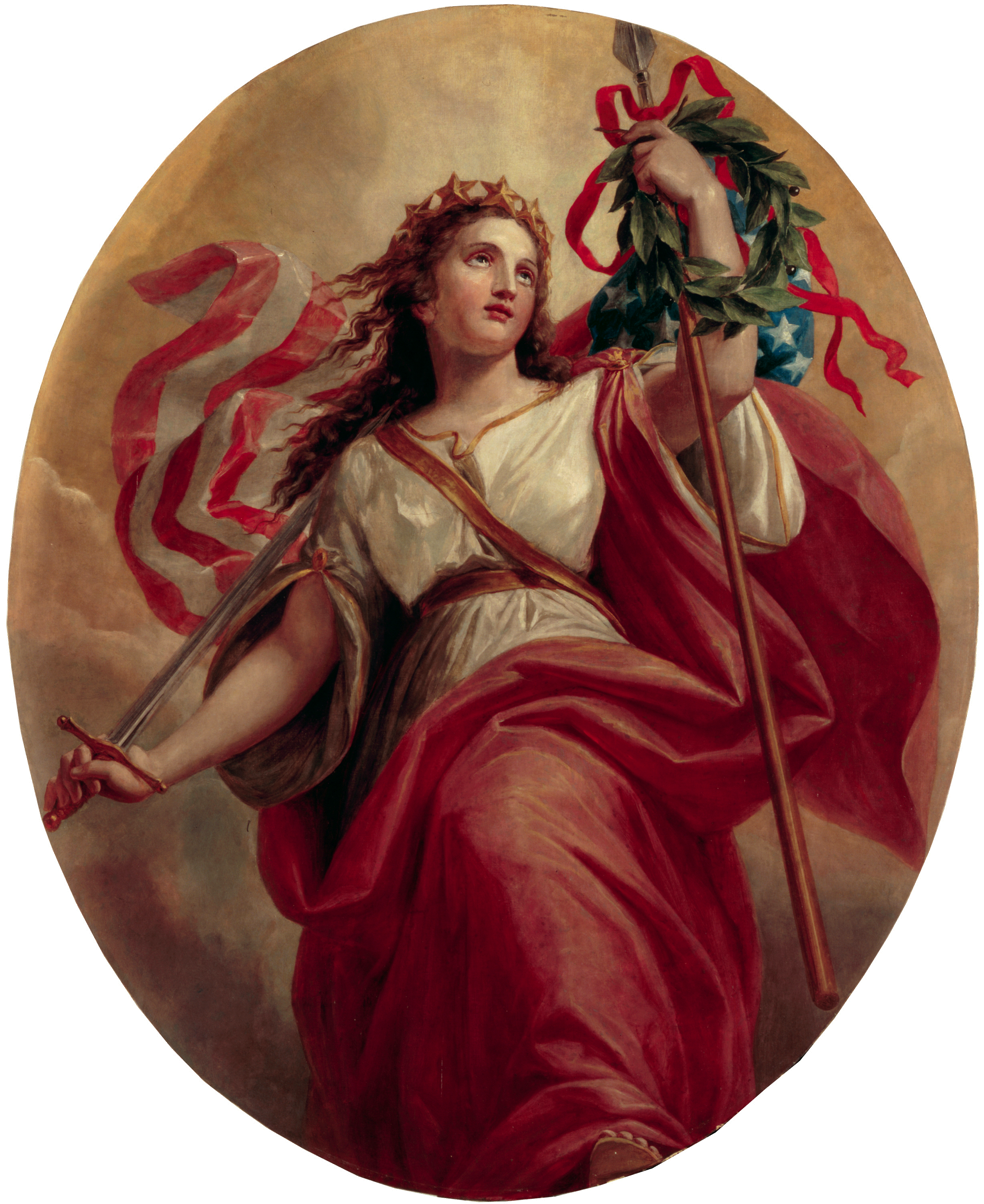
Liberty by Constantino Brumidi, 1869

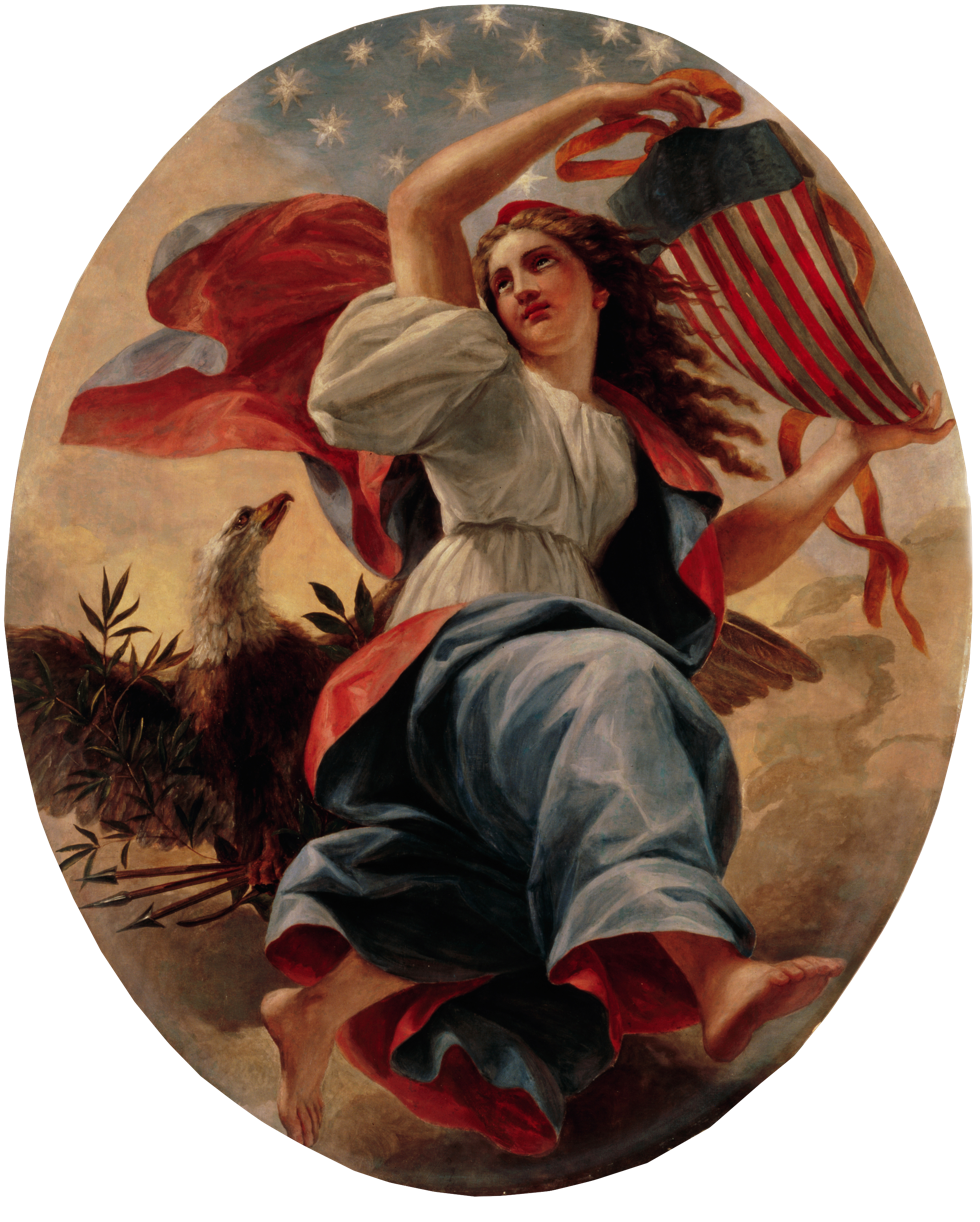
Union by Constantino Brumidi, 1869

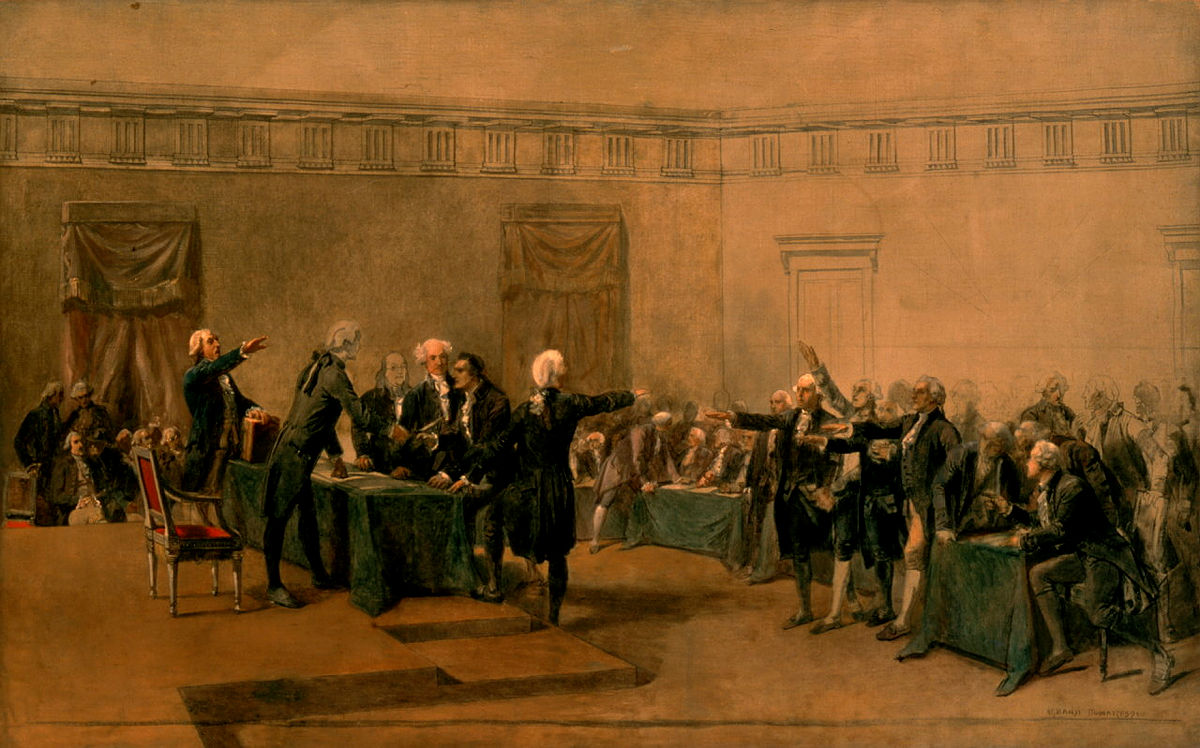
The Declaration of Independence of the United States of America, July 4, 1776 by Charles Édouard Armand-Dumaresq, c. 1873

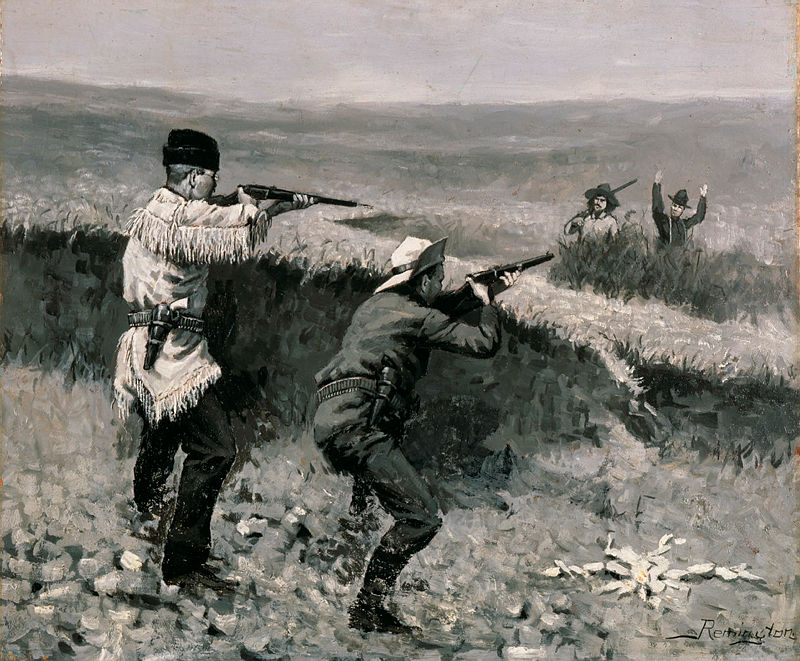
Hands Up! -- The Capture of Finnigan by Frederic Remington, 1888

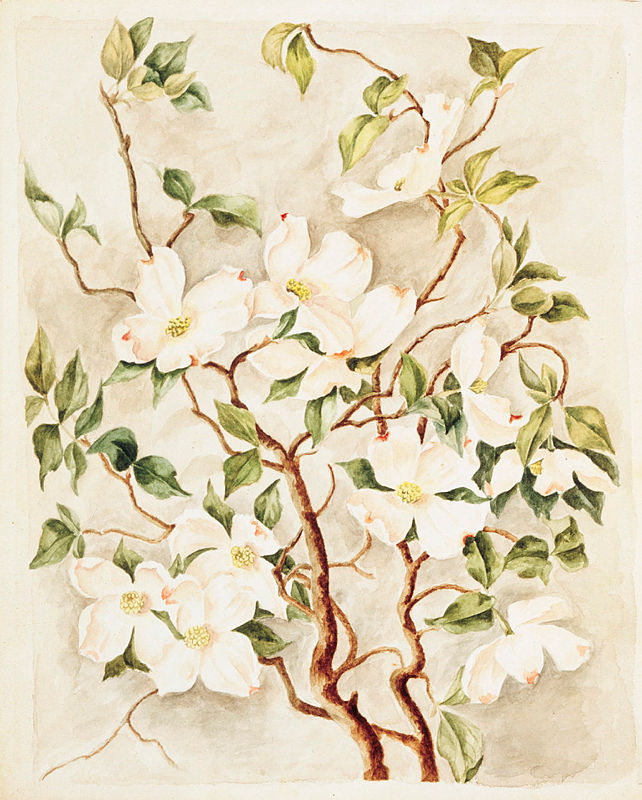
Flowering Dogwood by Caroline Harrison, c. 1889-1892

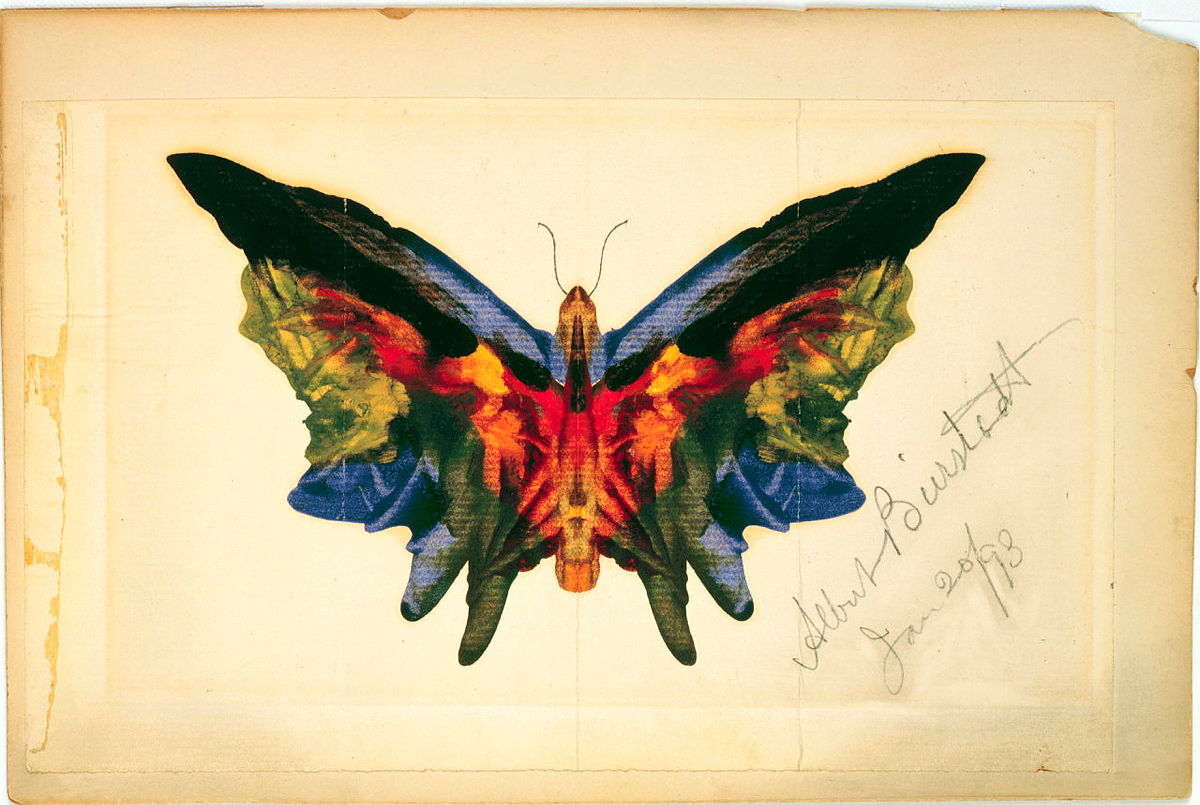
Butterfly by Albert Bierstadt, January 20, 1893

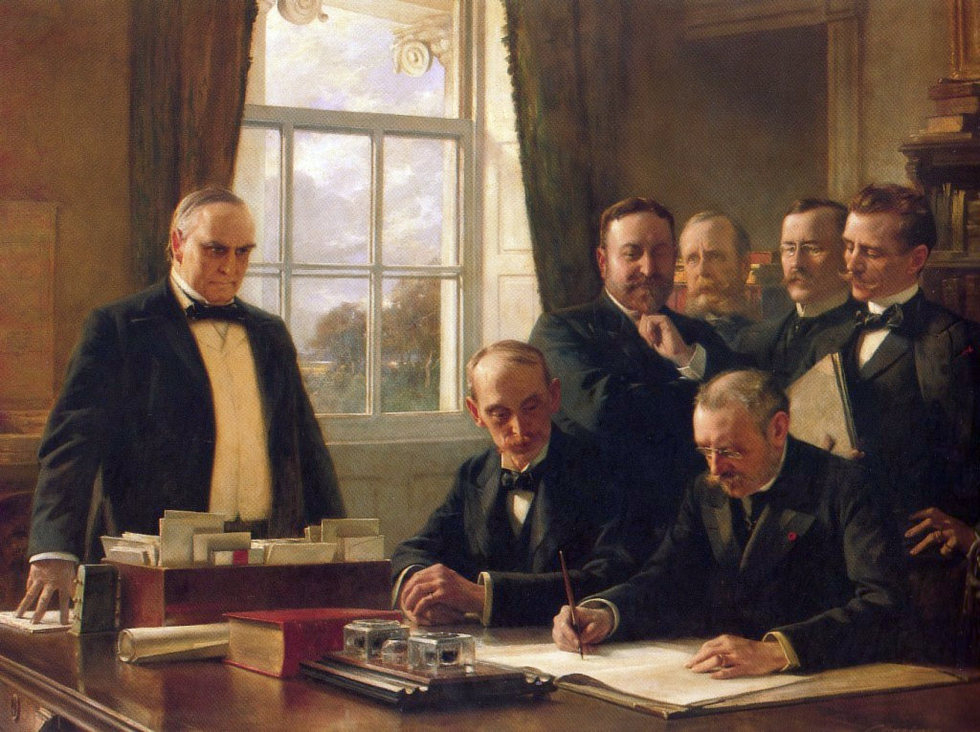
Signing of the Peace Protocol Between Spain and the United States, August 12, 1898 by Théobald Chartran, 1899

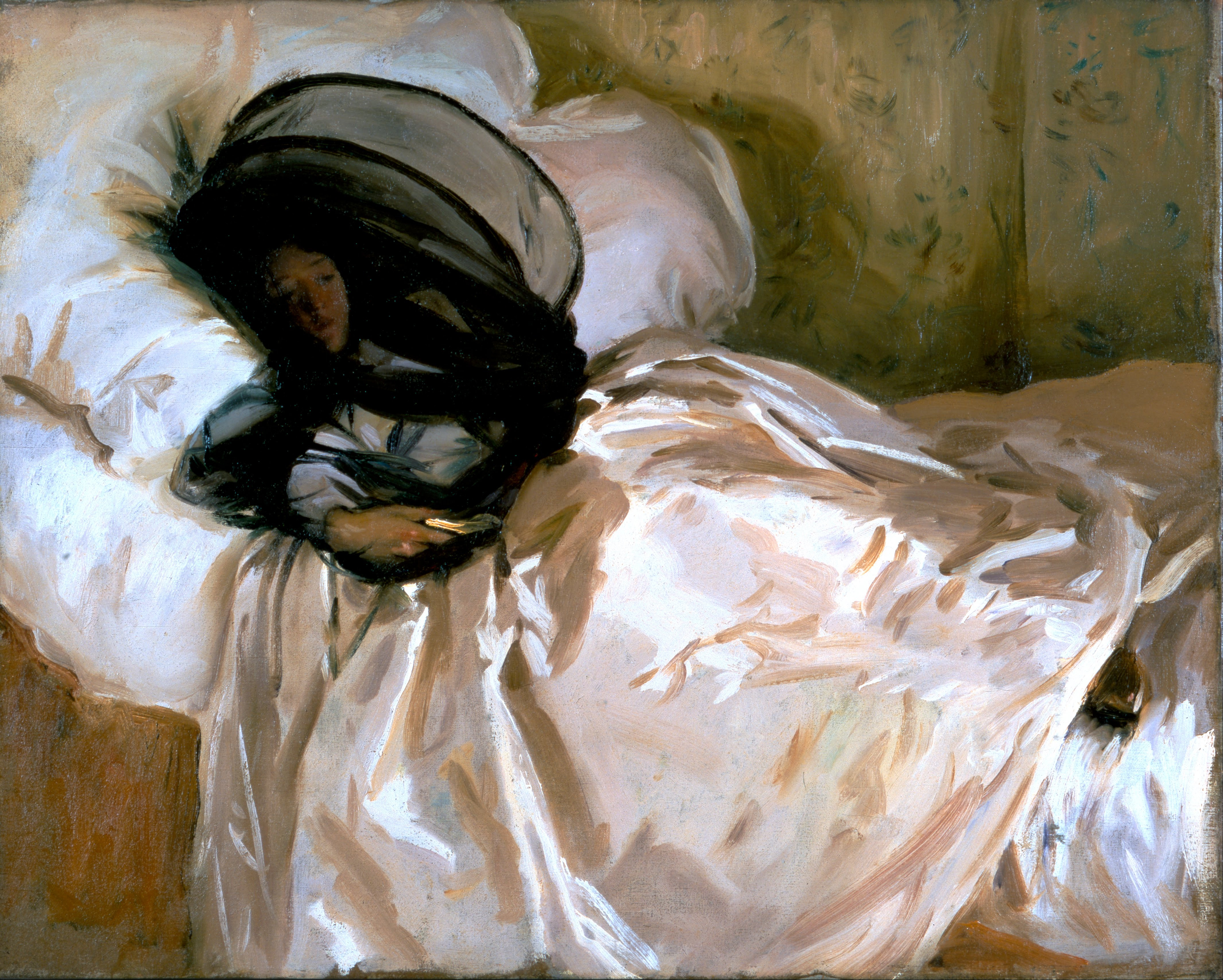
The Mosquito Net by John Singer Sargent, 1912

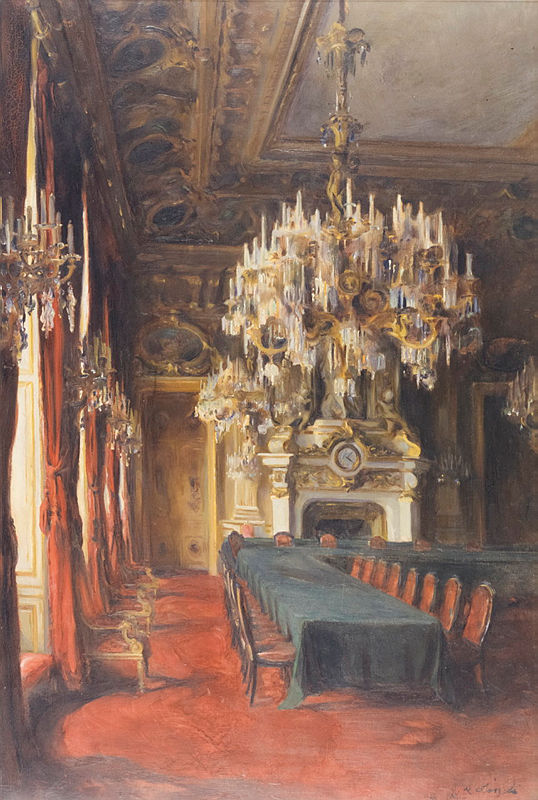
The Clock Room, Quai d'Orsay by Fülöp László, 1928

=== Sculptures ===
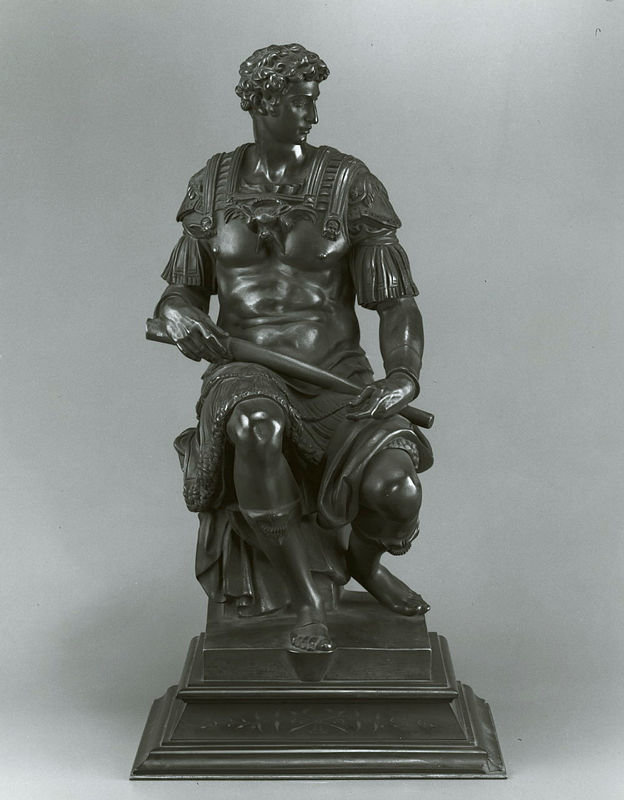
Giuliano de' Medici by Unknown, c. 1524-1534

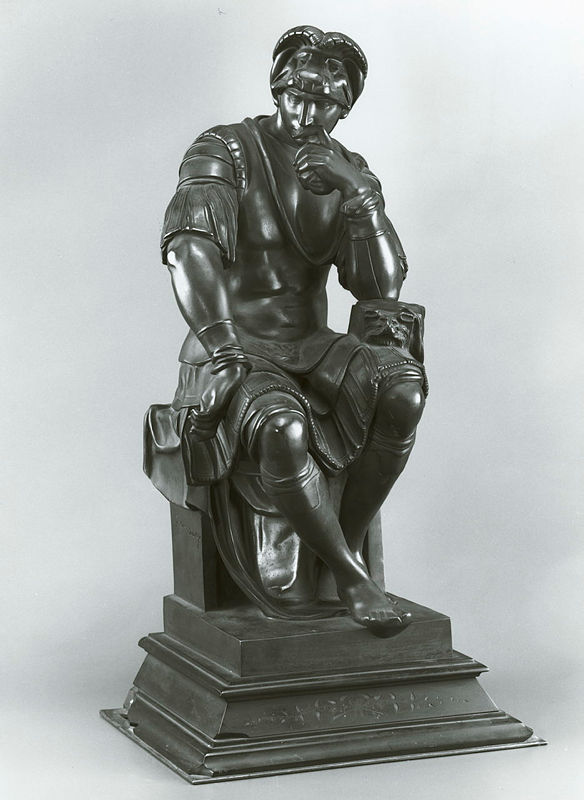
Lorenzo de' Medici by Unknown, c. 1524-1534

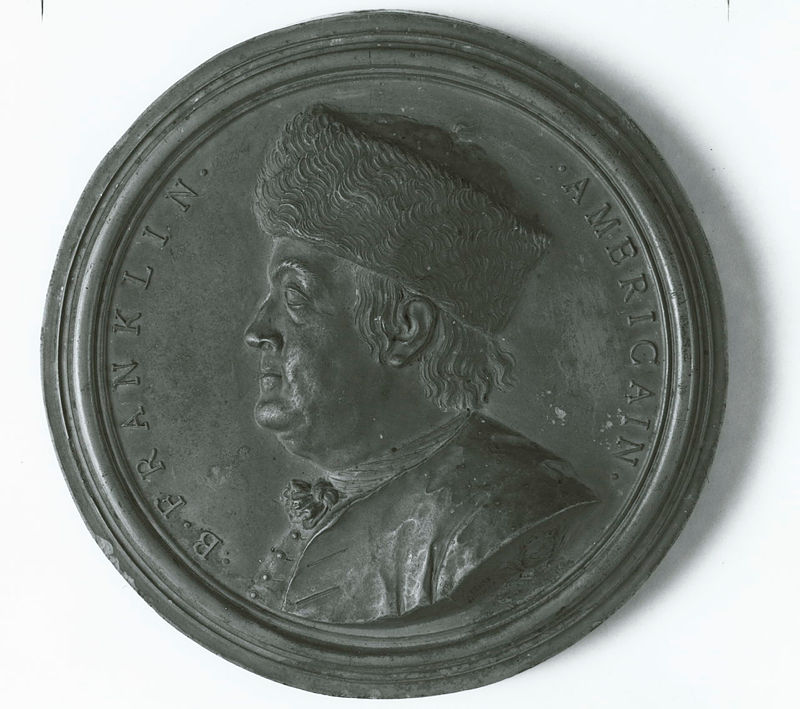
Benjamin Franklin by Giovan Battista Nini, 1777

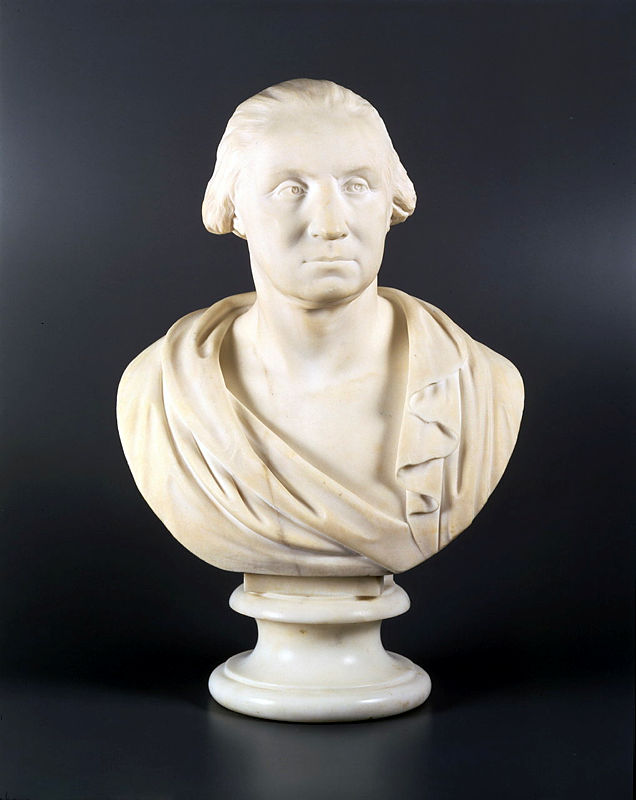
George Washington by Unknown, c. 1790

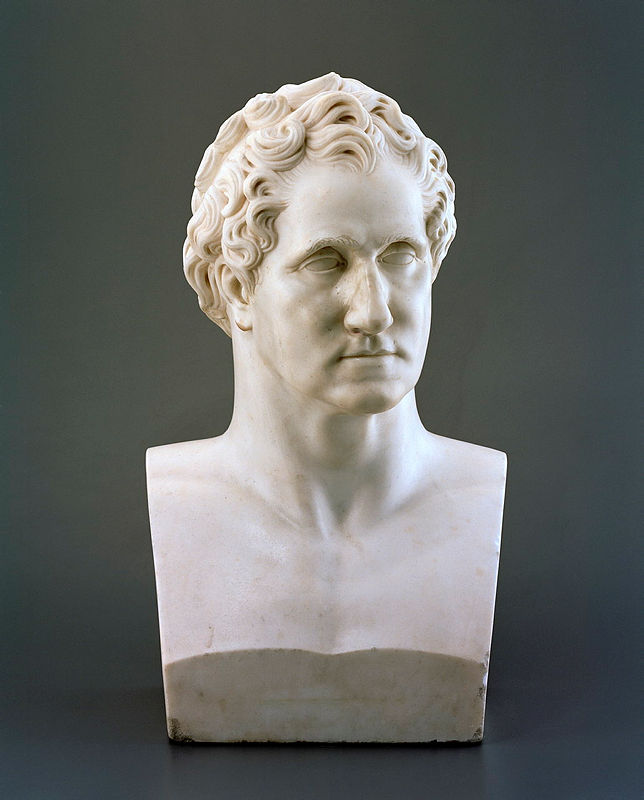
George Washington by Giuseppe Ceracchi, c. 1790-1794

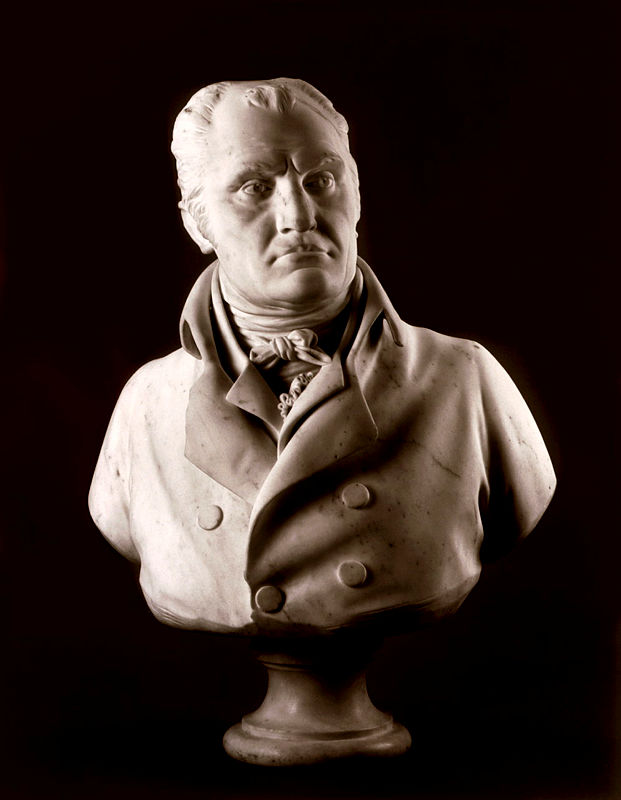
Joel Barlow by Jean Antoine Houdon, c. 1804

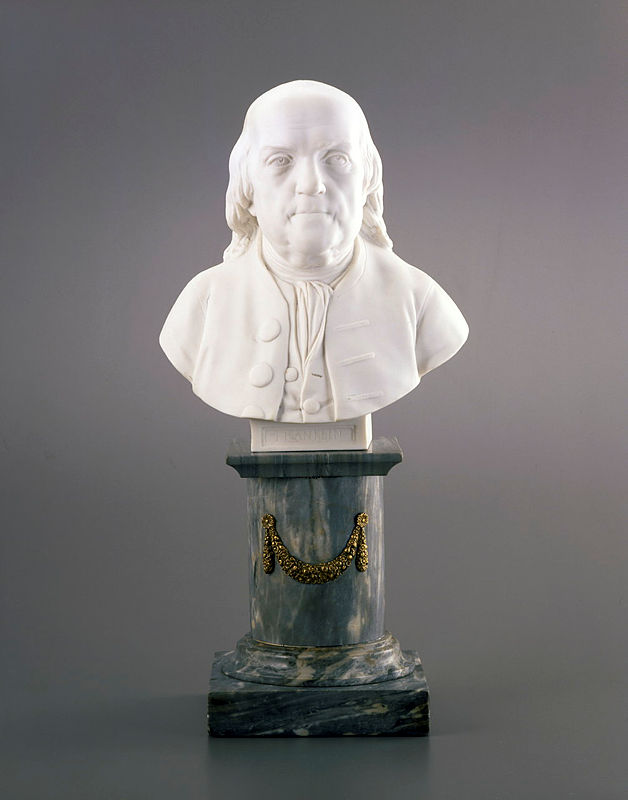
Benjamin Franklin by the National Porcelain Factory of Sèvres, c. 1810

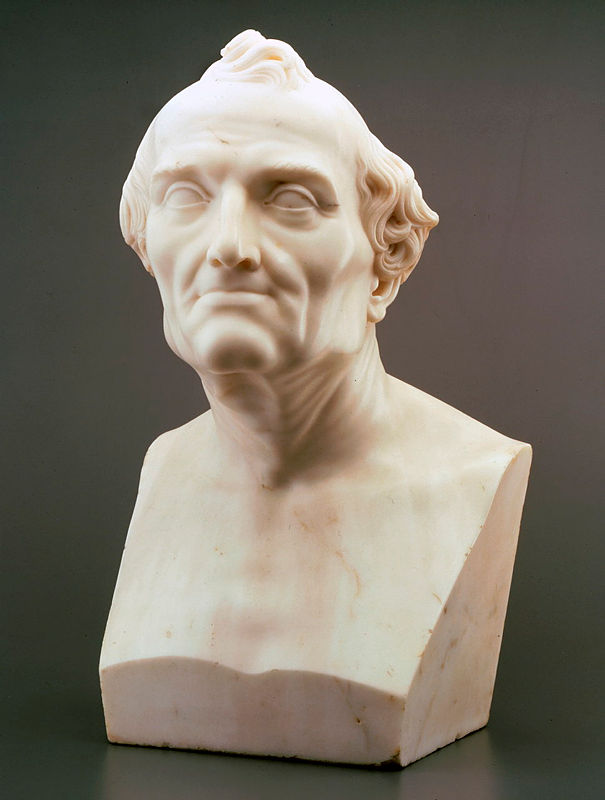
Amerigo Vespucci by Giuseppe Ceracchi, c. 1815

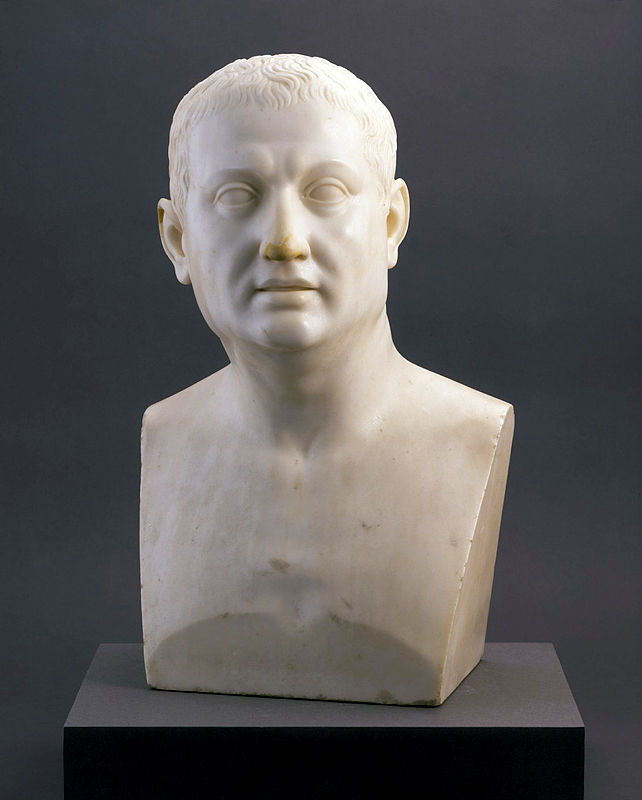
Christopher Columbus by Giuseppe Ceracchi, c. 1815

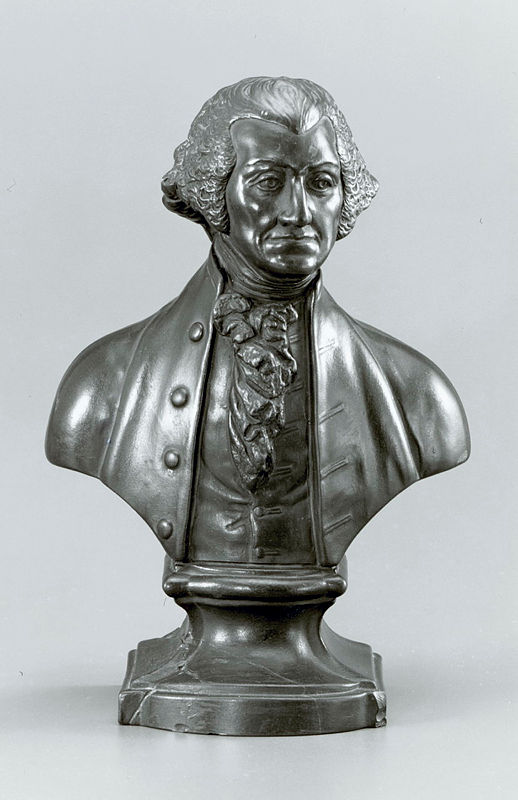
George Washington by Enoch Wood, 1818

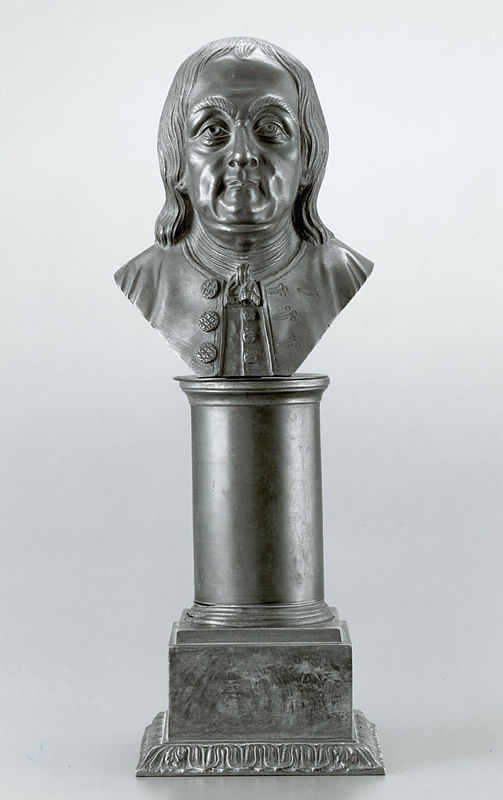
Benjamin Franklin by Unknown, c. 1820

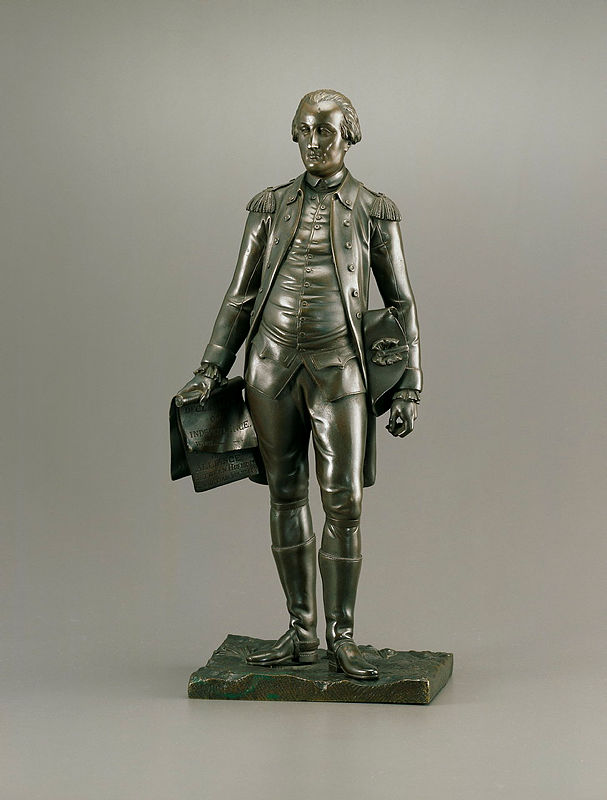
George Washington by Unknown, c. 1830-1850

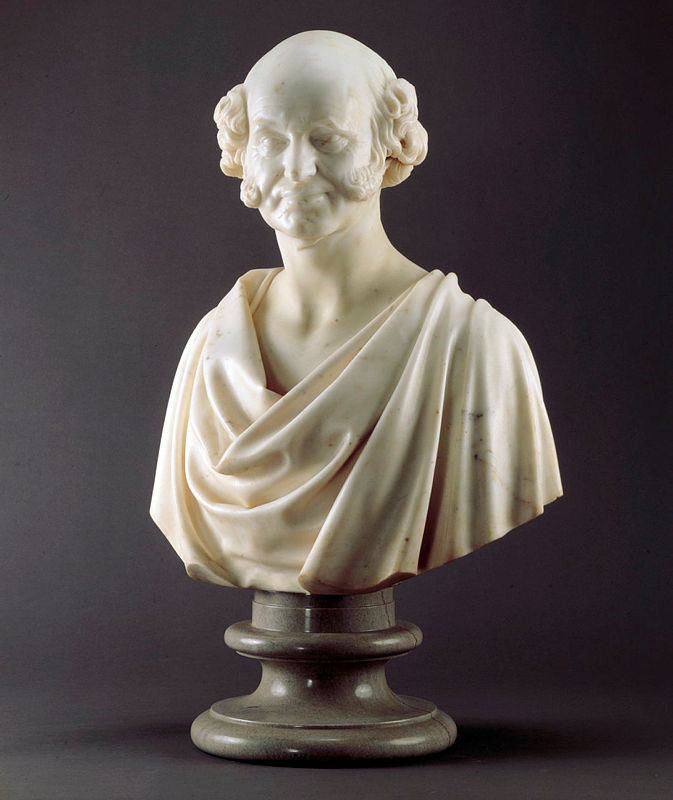
Martin Van Buren by Hiram Powers, 1840

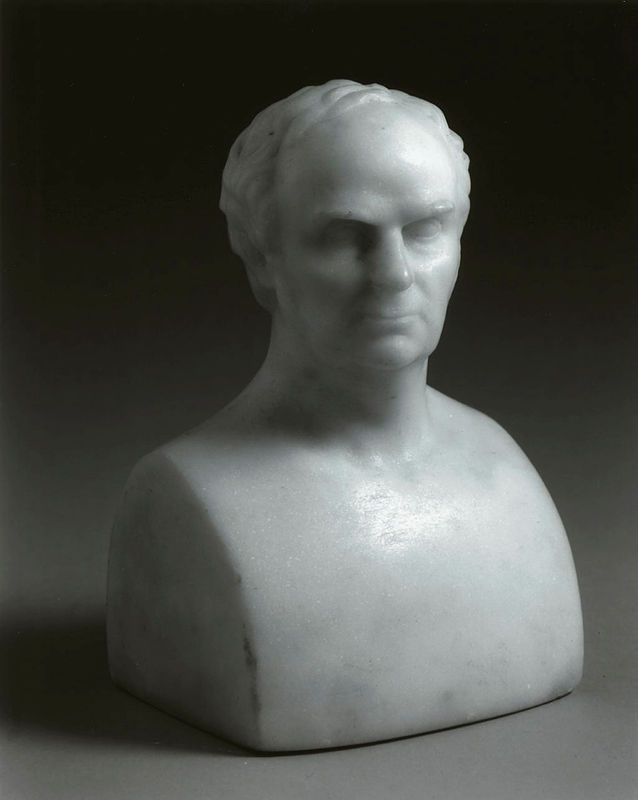
Daniel Webster by Unknown, Mid 19th-century

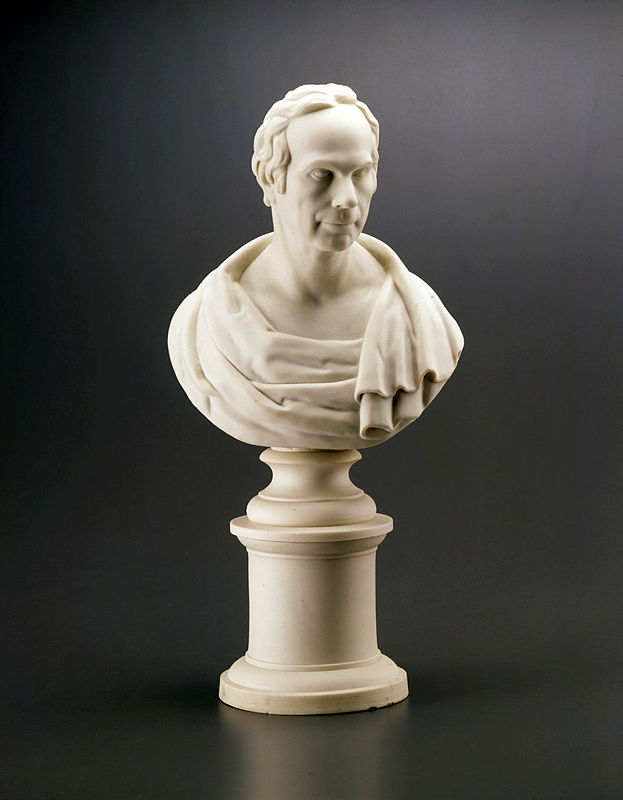
Henry Clay by Joel T. Hart, c. 1850-1860

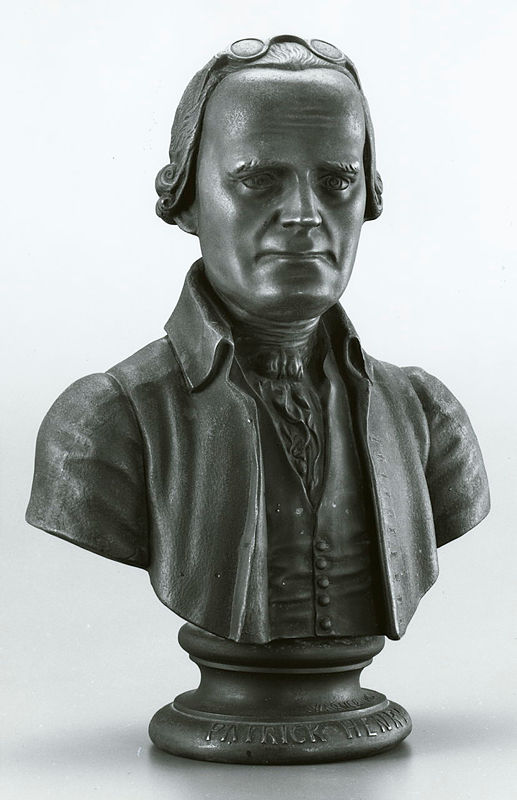
Patrick Henry by Miskey Warner, c. 1860

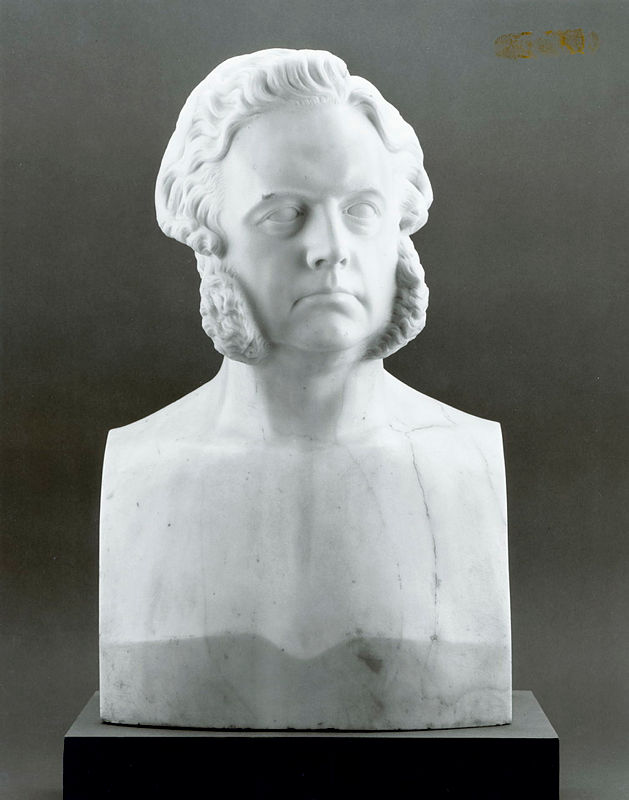
John Bright by John Warrington Wood, 1864

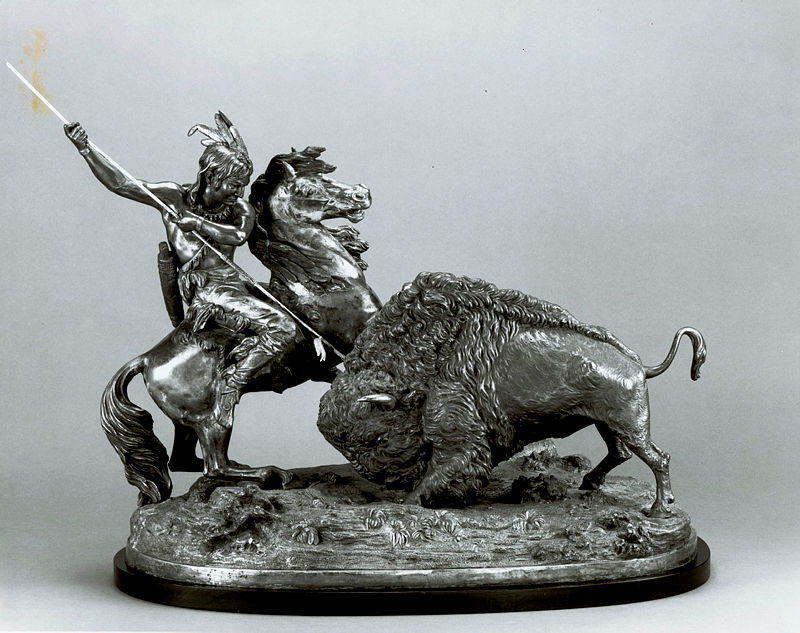
The Buffalo Hunt by Theodore Baur, c. 1882-1886

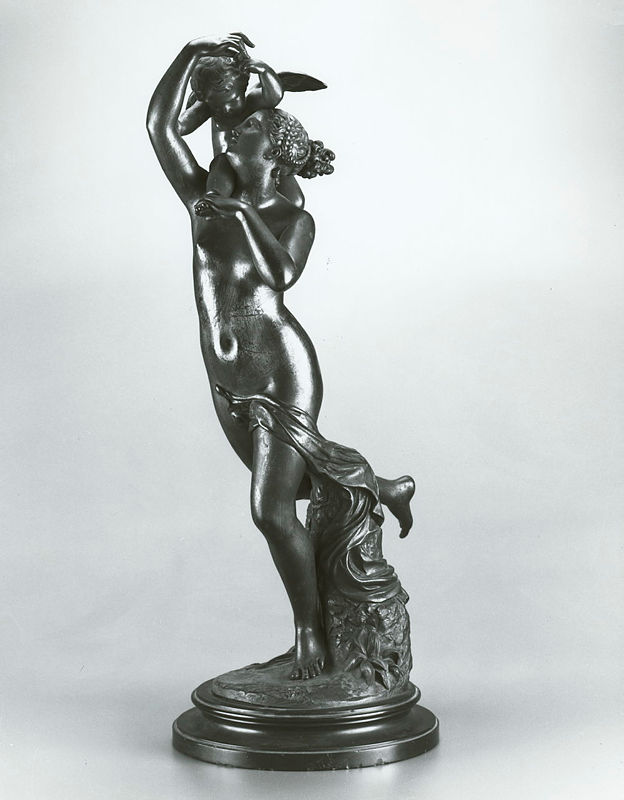
Female with Cupid by Unknown, c. 1870

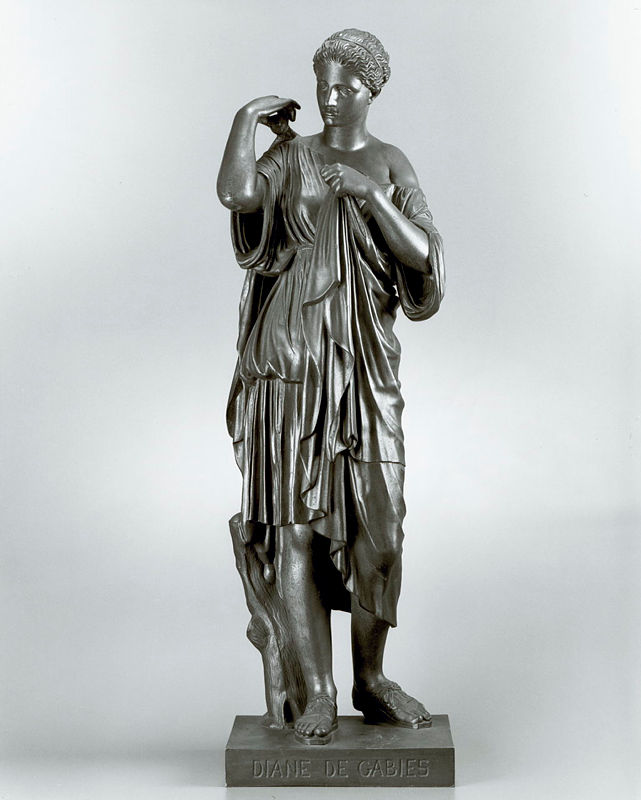
Diane De Gabies by Unknown, c. 1870

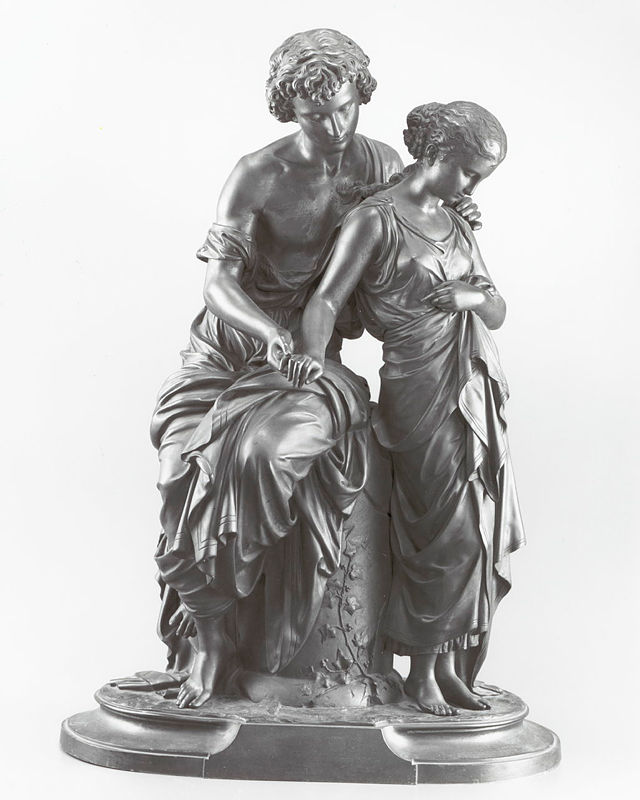
Classical Male and Female by Unknown, c. 1870

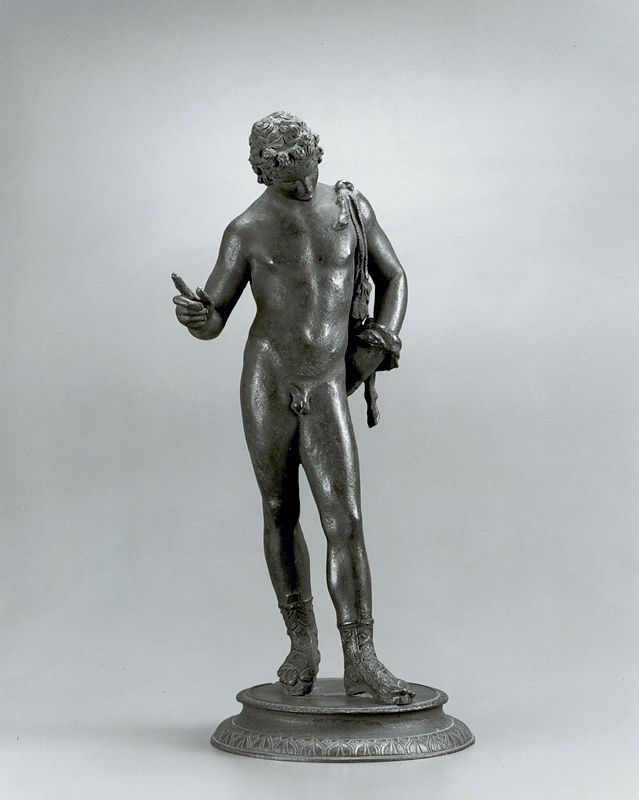
Classical Male Figure by Unknown, c. 1870

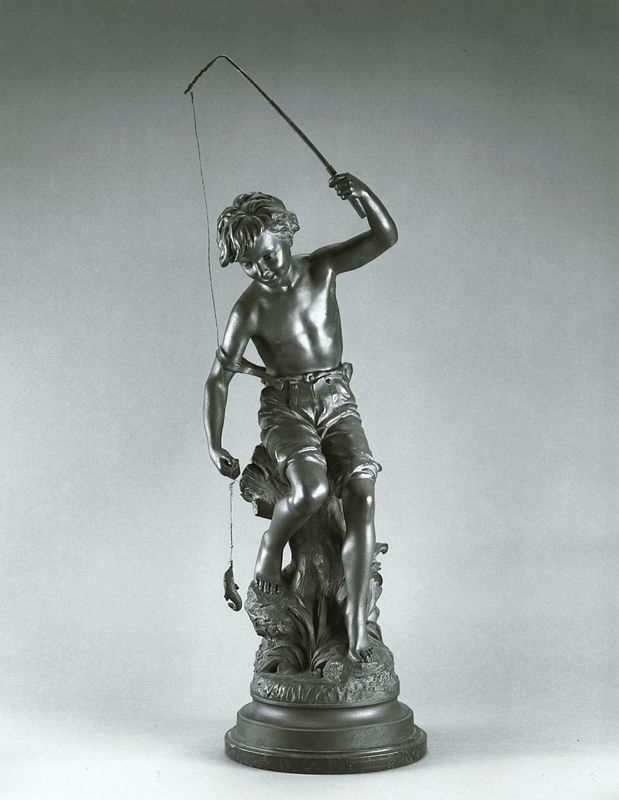
Angler by Sylvain Kinsburger, Late 19th-century

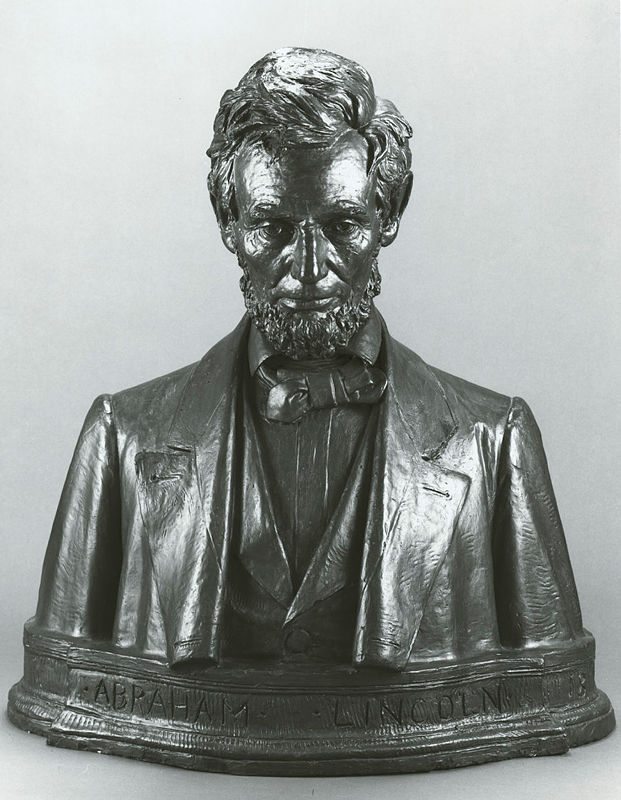
Abraham Lincoln by Charles Henry Niehaus, Late 19th-century

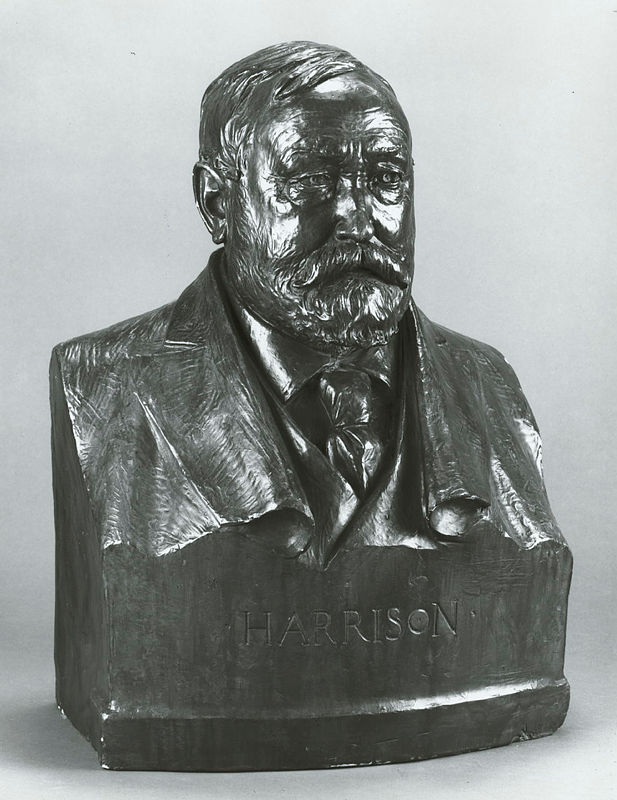
Benjamin Harrison by Charles Henry Niehaus, Late 19th-century

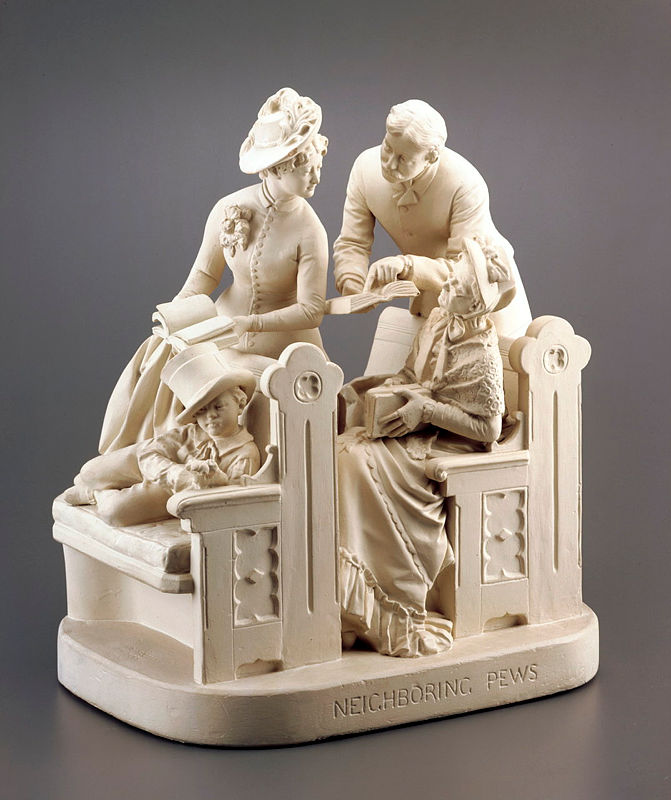
Neighboring Pews by John Rogers, 1883

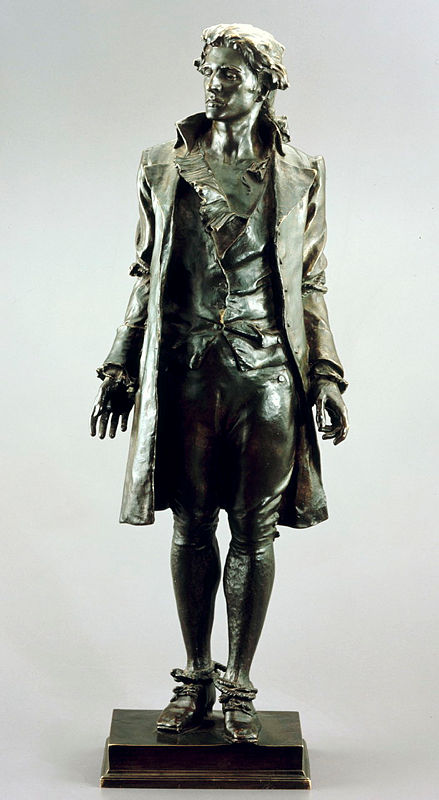
Nathan Hale by Frederick William MacMonnies, c. 1890

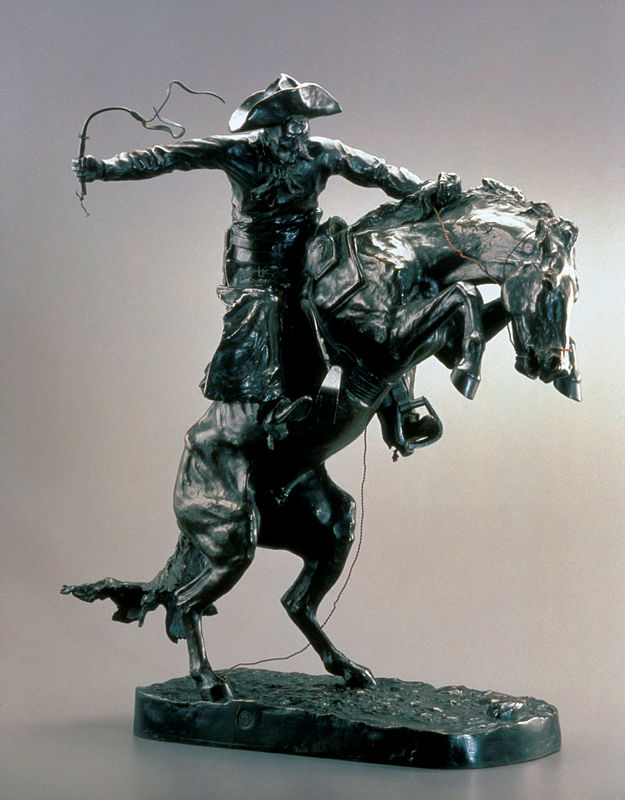
The Bronco Buster by Frederic Remington, c. 1903

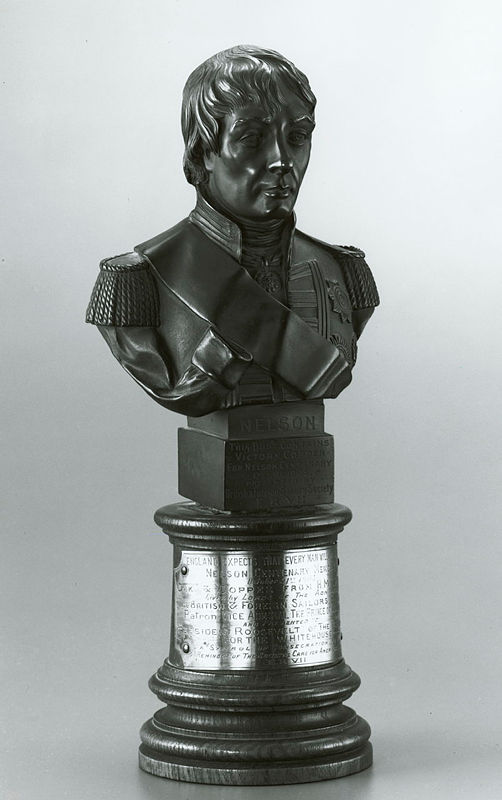
Horatio Nelson by Unknown, 1905

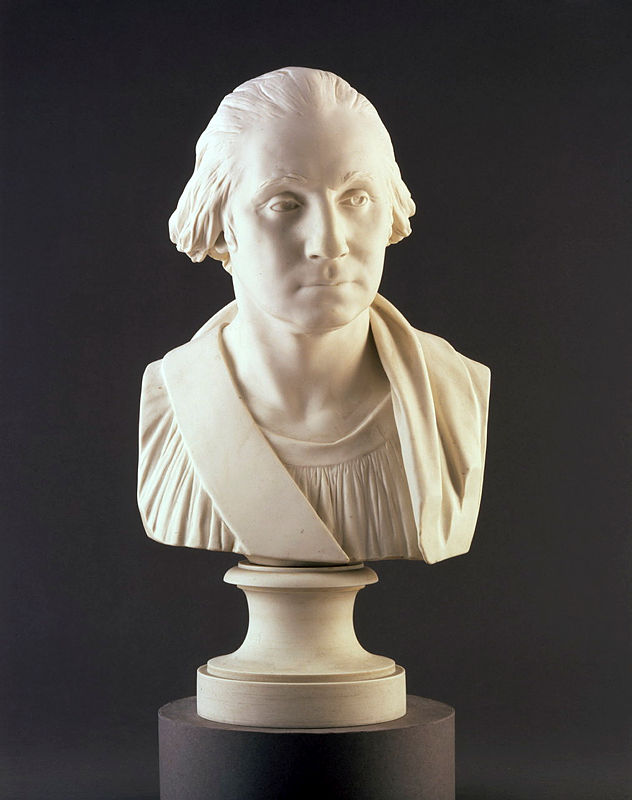
George Washington by the National Porcelain Factory of Sèvres, 1905

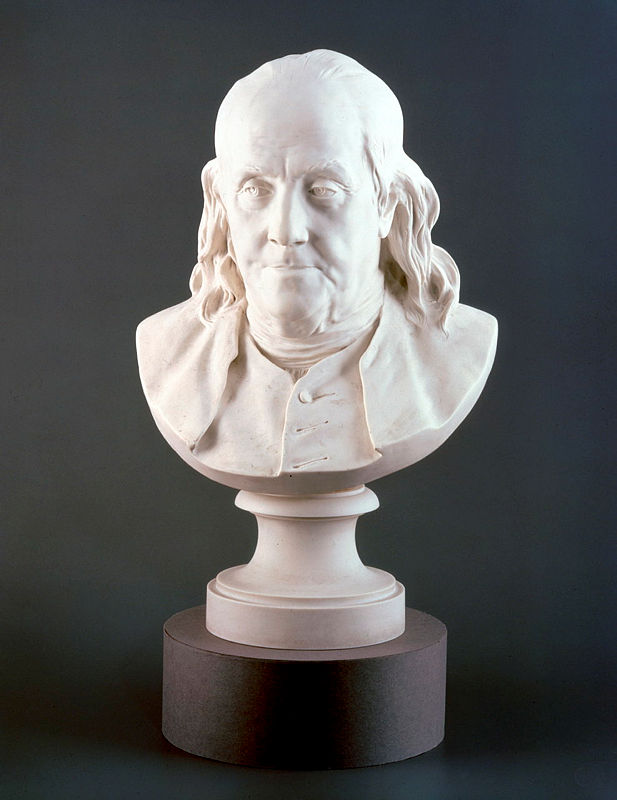
Benjamin Franklin by the National Porcelain Factory of Sèvres, 1905

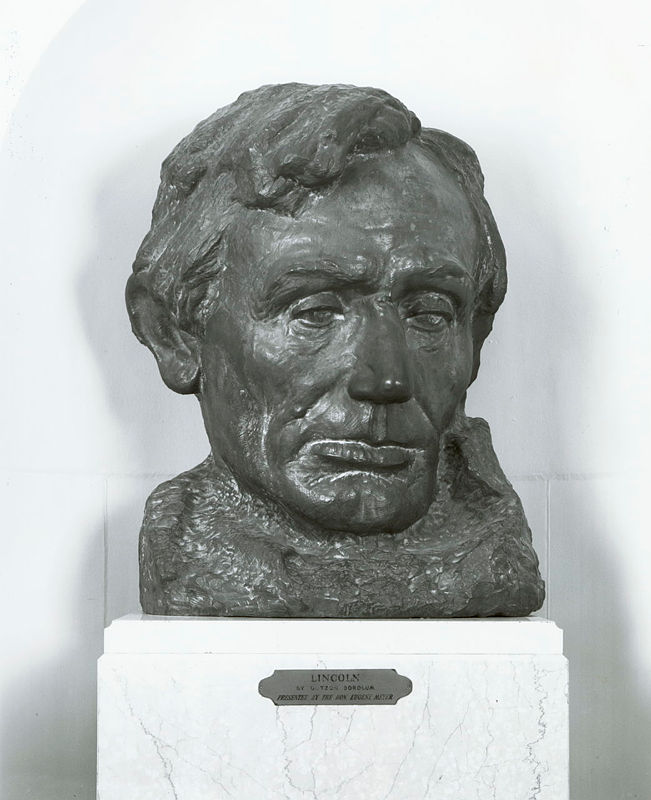
Abraham Lincoln by Gutzon Borglum, 1908

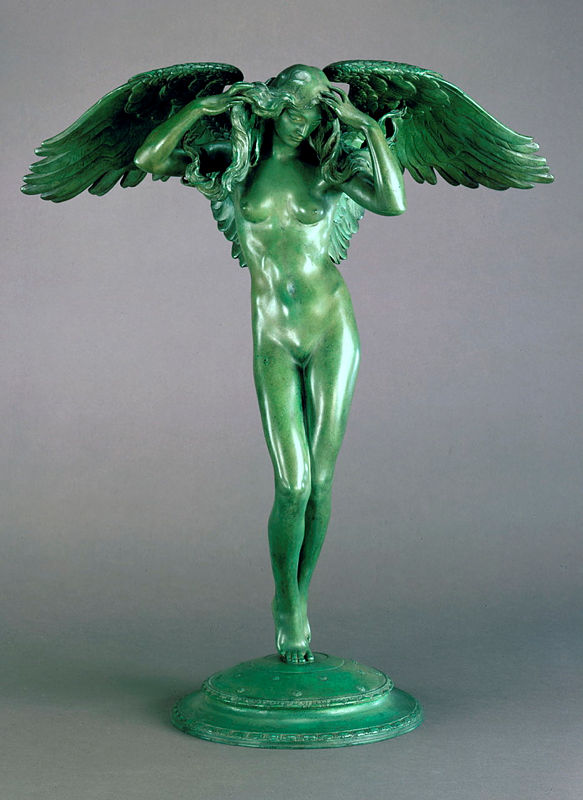
Descending Night by Adolph Alexander Weinman, c. 1915-1923

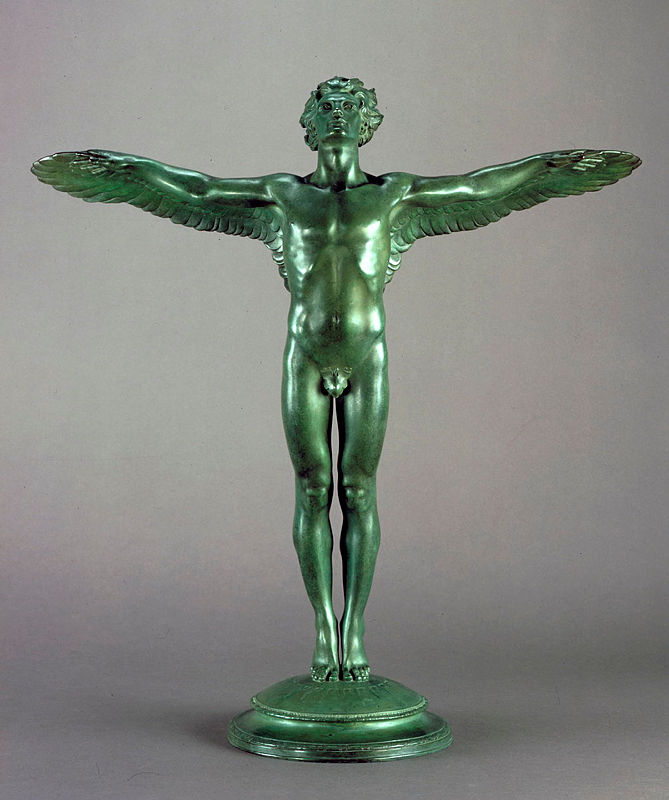
Rising Day by Adolph Alexander Weinman, c. 1915-1923

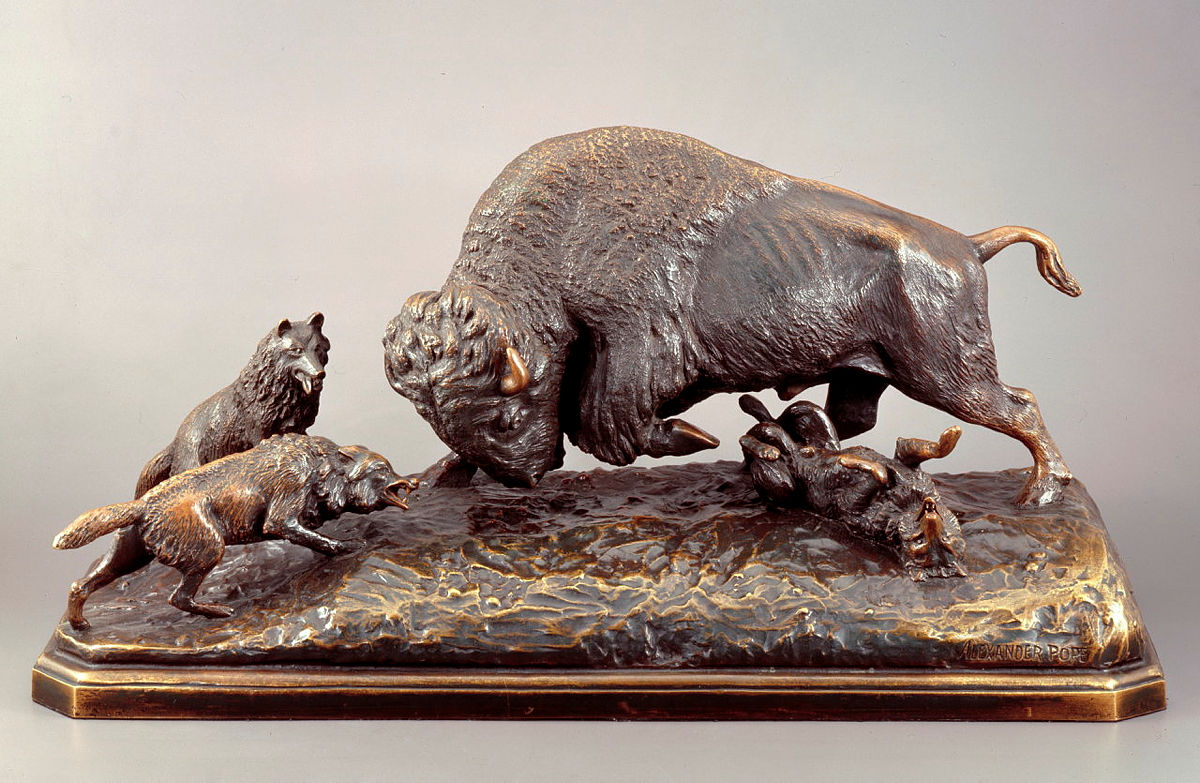
Our Vanishing Wildlife by Alexander Pope Jr., c. 1915-1924

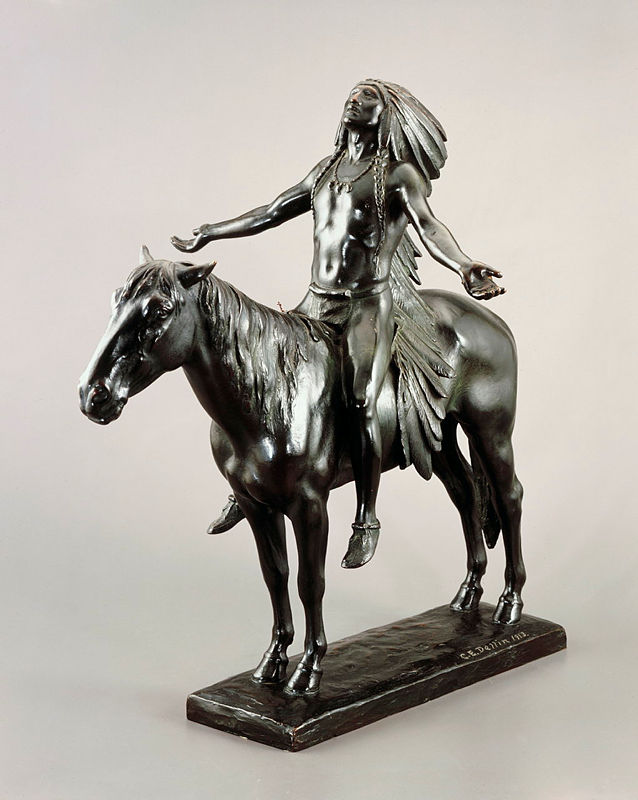
Appeal to the Great Spirit by Cyrus E. Dallin, c. 1916

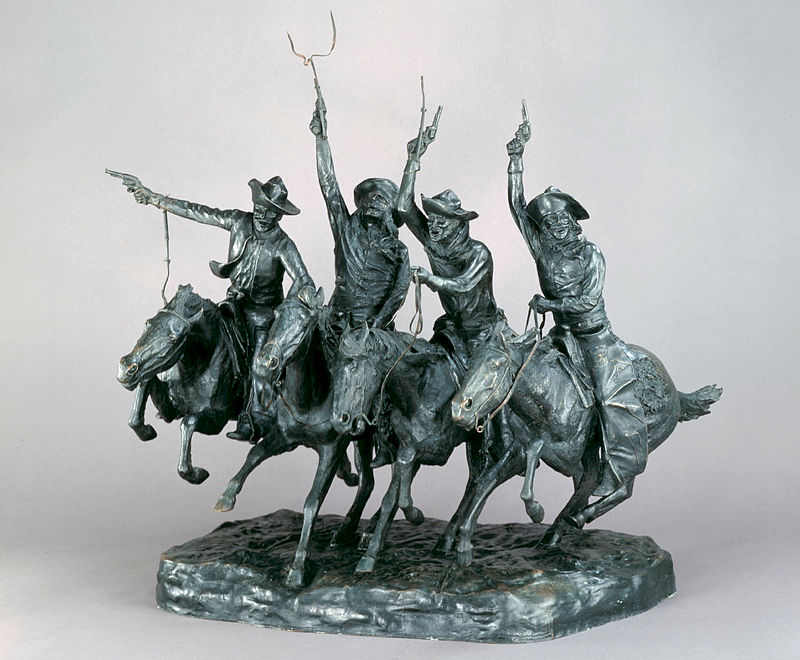
Coming Through the Rye by Frederic Remington, 1918

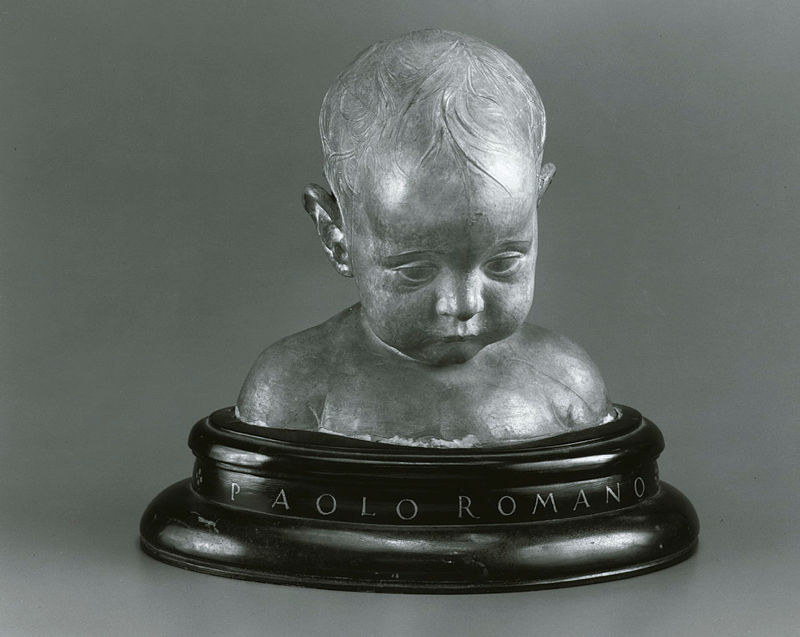
Paolo Romano (Jennewein) by Carl Paul Jennewein, 1918

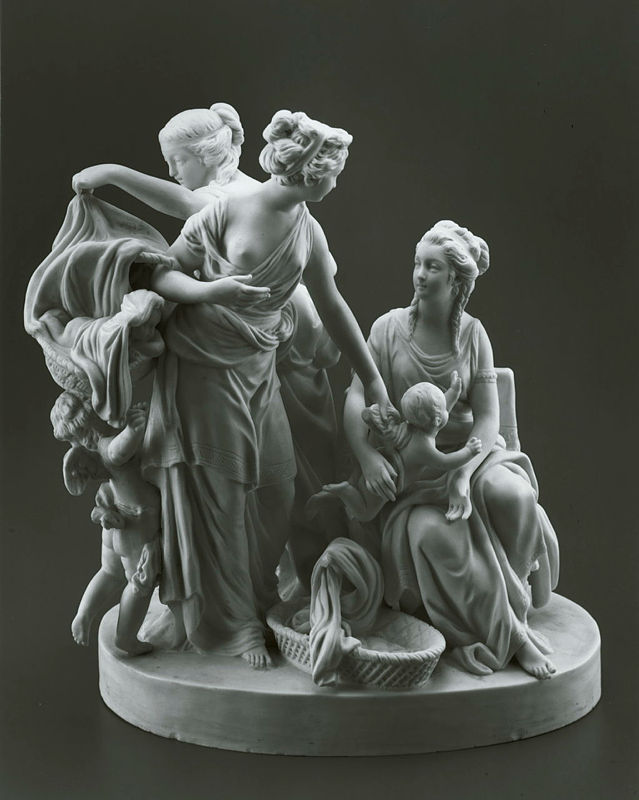
Women and Cherubs by the National Porcelain Factory of Sèvres, 1920

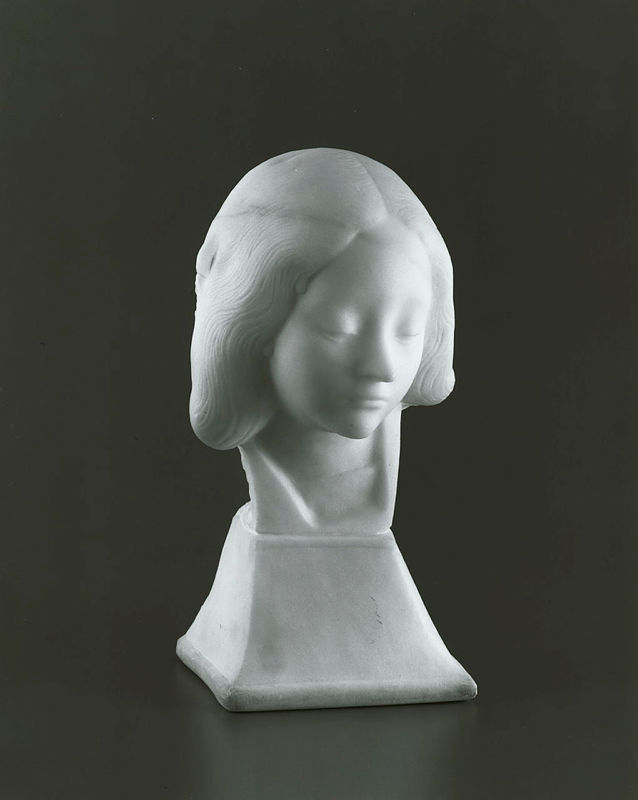
Fortunata by Andrew O'Connor, c. 1923

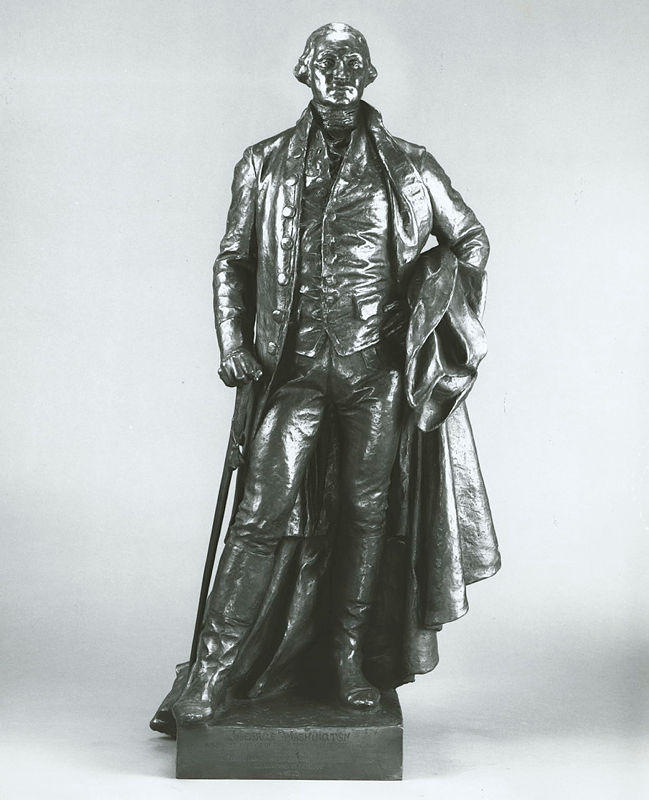
George Washington by Gyula Julius Bezeredi, 1923

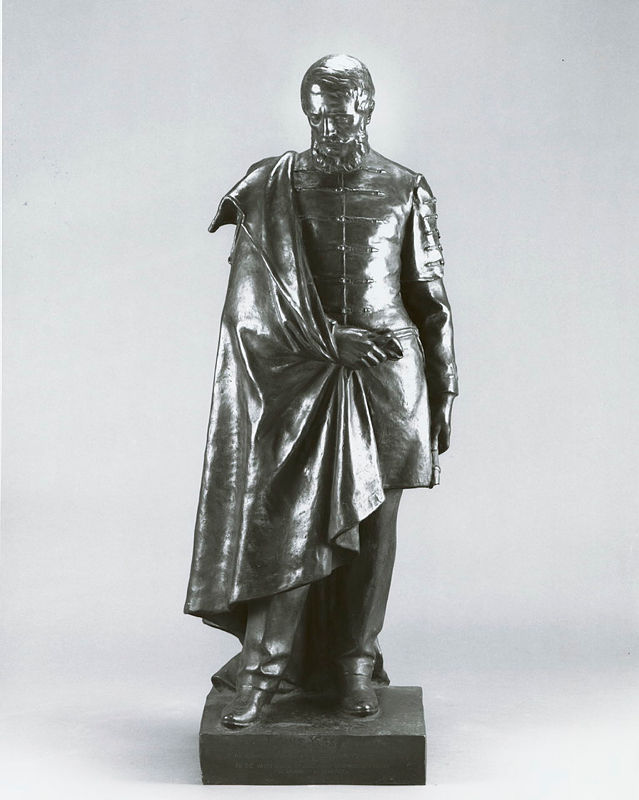
Louis Kossuth by Gyula Julius Bezeredi, 1923

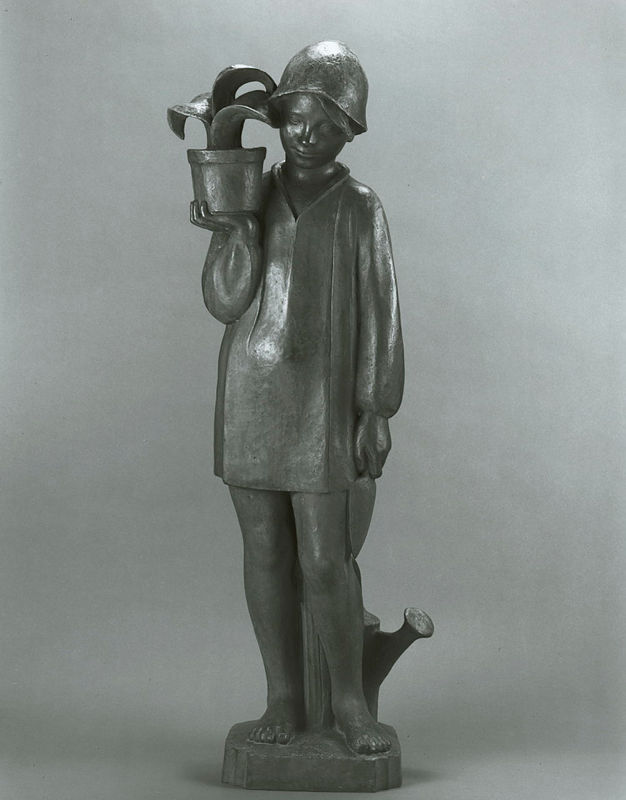
Gardener by Sylvia Shaw Judson, 1929

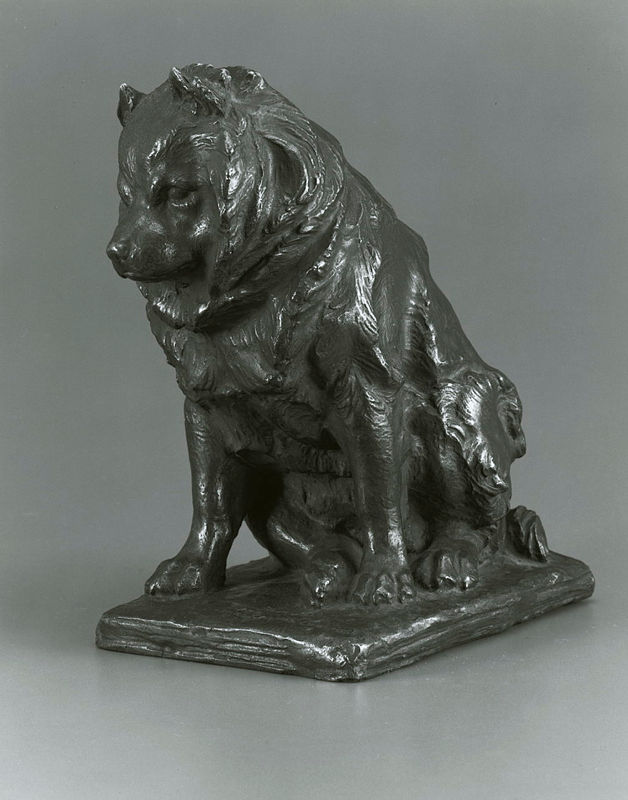
Timmy (Tiny Tim) by Laura Gardin Fraser, 1929

== See also ==
- Committee for the Preservation of the White House
- United States Capitol art
  - List of artwork at the United States Capitol complex
- White House Acquisition Trust
