= Seated Peasant (Cézanne) =

Painting by Paul Cézanne

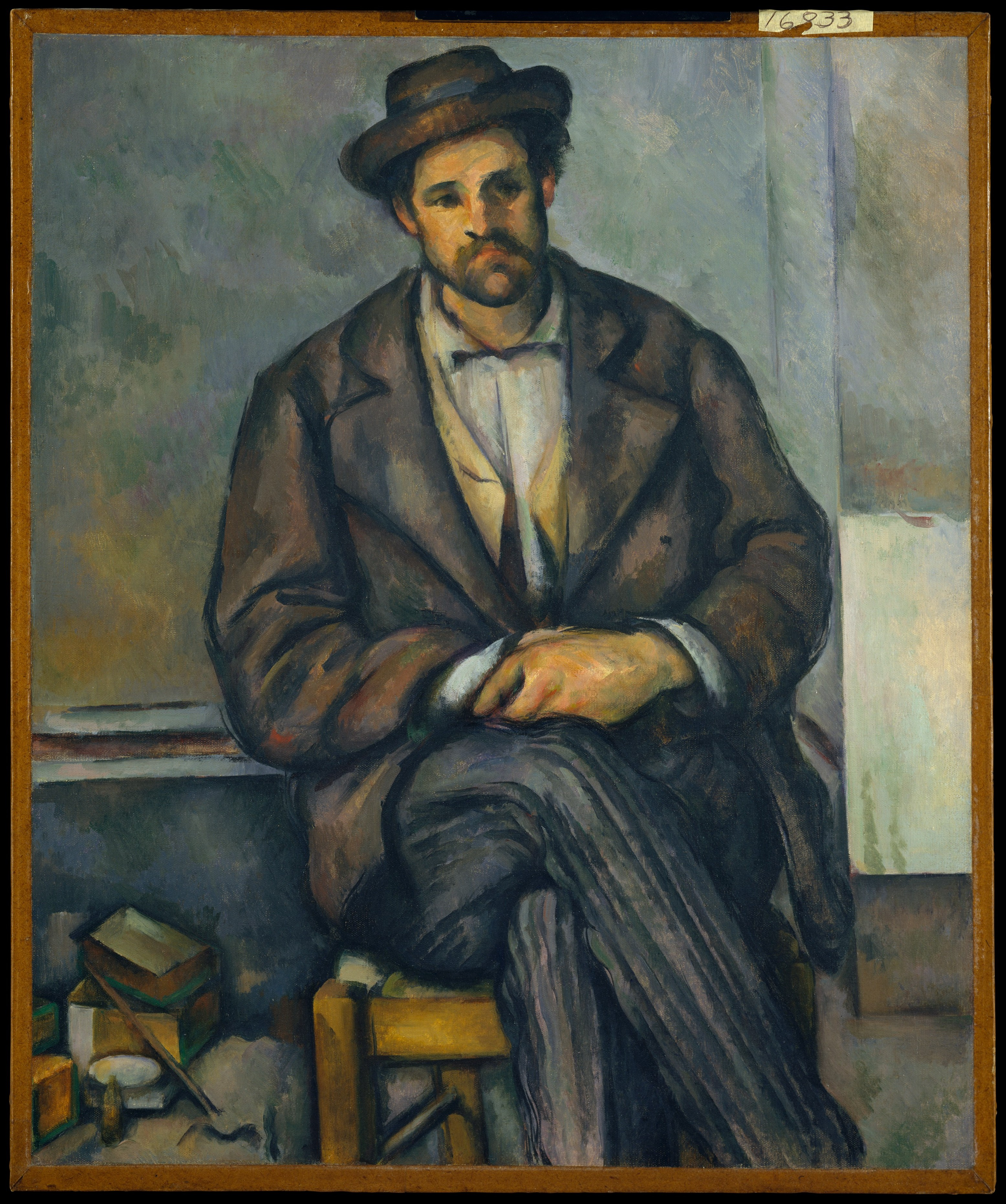
- Artist: Paul Cézanne
- Year: c. 1892–96
- Medium: Oil on canvas
- Dimensions: 54.6 cm × 45.1 cm (21.5 in × 17.8 in)
- Location: Metropolitan Museum of Art, New York
- Accession: 1997.60.2

Seated Peasant is an oil on canvas painting by French artist Paul Cézanne, from c. 1892-1896. The work depicts a seated peasant, most likely a worker at Jas de Bouffan, Cézanne's family estate in Aix-en-Provence. The painting is credibly dated between 1892 and 1896. It is currently in the collection of the Metropolitan Museum of Art.

== See also ==
- List of paintings by Paul Cézanne
