= The Pool at Jas de Bouffan =

1876 painting by Paul Cézanne

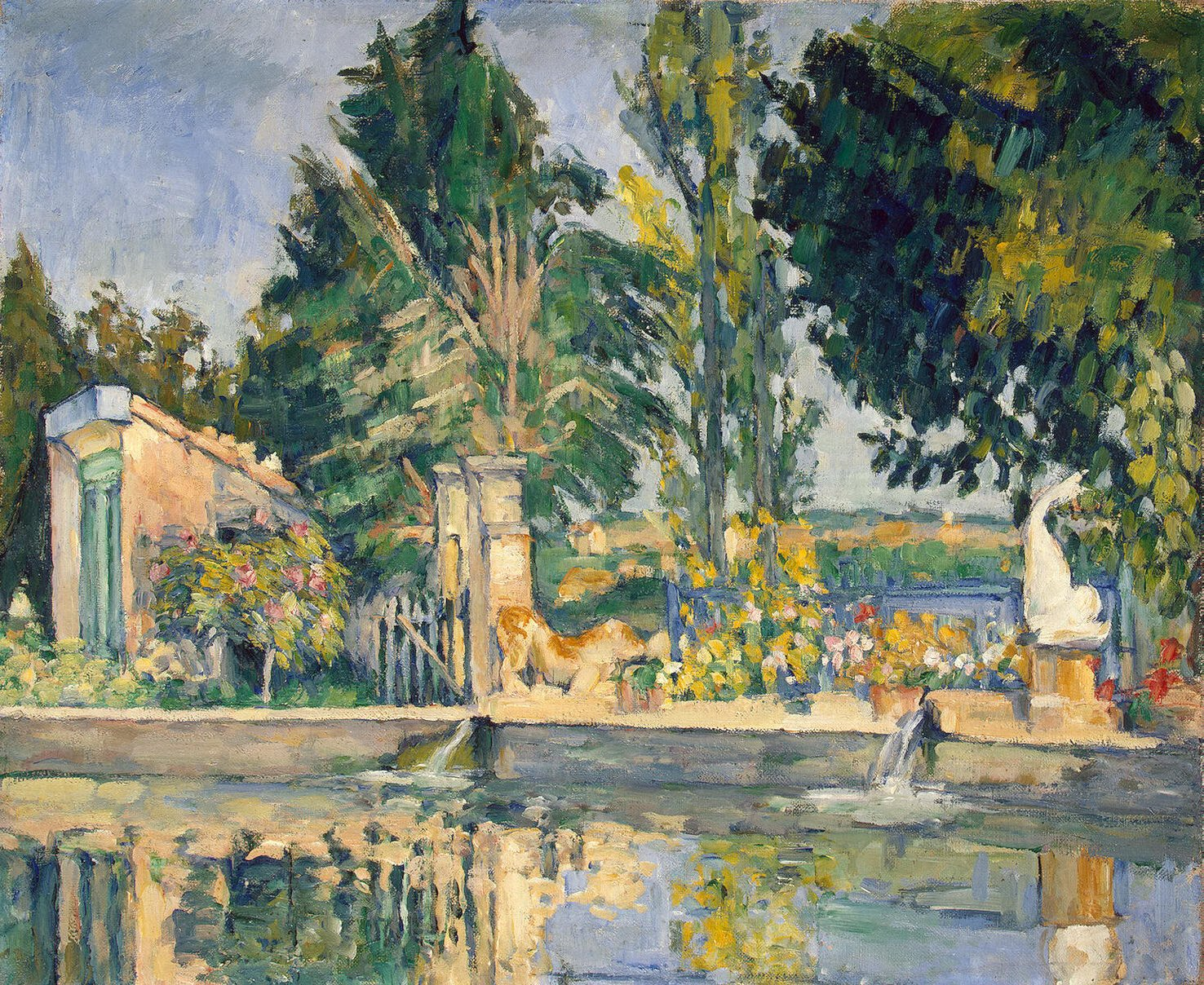
- Artist: Paul Cézanne
- Year: 1876
- Medium: Oil on canvas
- Dimensions: 46.1 cm × 56.3 cm (18.1 in × 22.2 in)
- Location: Hermitage Museum, Saint Petersburg

The Pool at Jas de Bouffan, also known as Jas de Bouffan, the Pool, is an oil-on-canvas landscape painting by the French artist Paul Cézanne, created around 1876. The work measures approximately 46.1 by 56.3 centimetres and is held in the State Hermitage Museum in Saint Petersburg.

== Subject and composition ==
The painting depicts a pool in the grounds of Jas de Bouffan, the Cézanne family estate near Aix-en-Provence. Cézanne’s father acquired the property in 1859, and the artist repeatedly used its house, gardens, trees and water features as subjects throughout his career.

The composition shows part of the large pool surrounded by dense vegetation. Architectural and sculptural elements, including a gate, a small building and ornamental figures of a lion and a dolphin, appear among the trees. Their forms are reflected in the still water, linking the foreground and background of the scene.

== Provenance ==
The painting was formerly part of the collection of the German industrialist and art collector Otto Krebs at Holzdorf. After the Second World War, works from the Krebs collection were transferred to the Soviet Union. The painting later became part of the collection of the State Hermitage Museum.

== See also ==
- List of paintings by Paul Cézanne
