= List of paintings by Paul Cézanne =

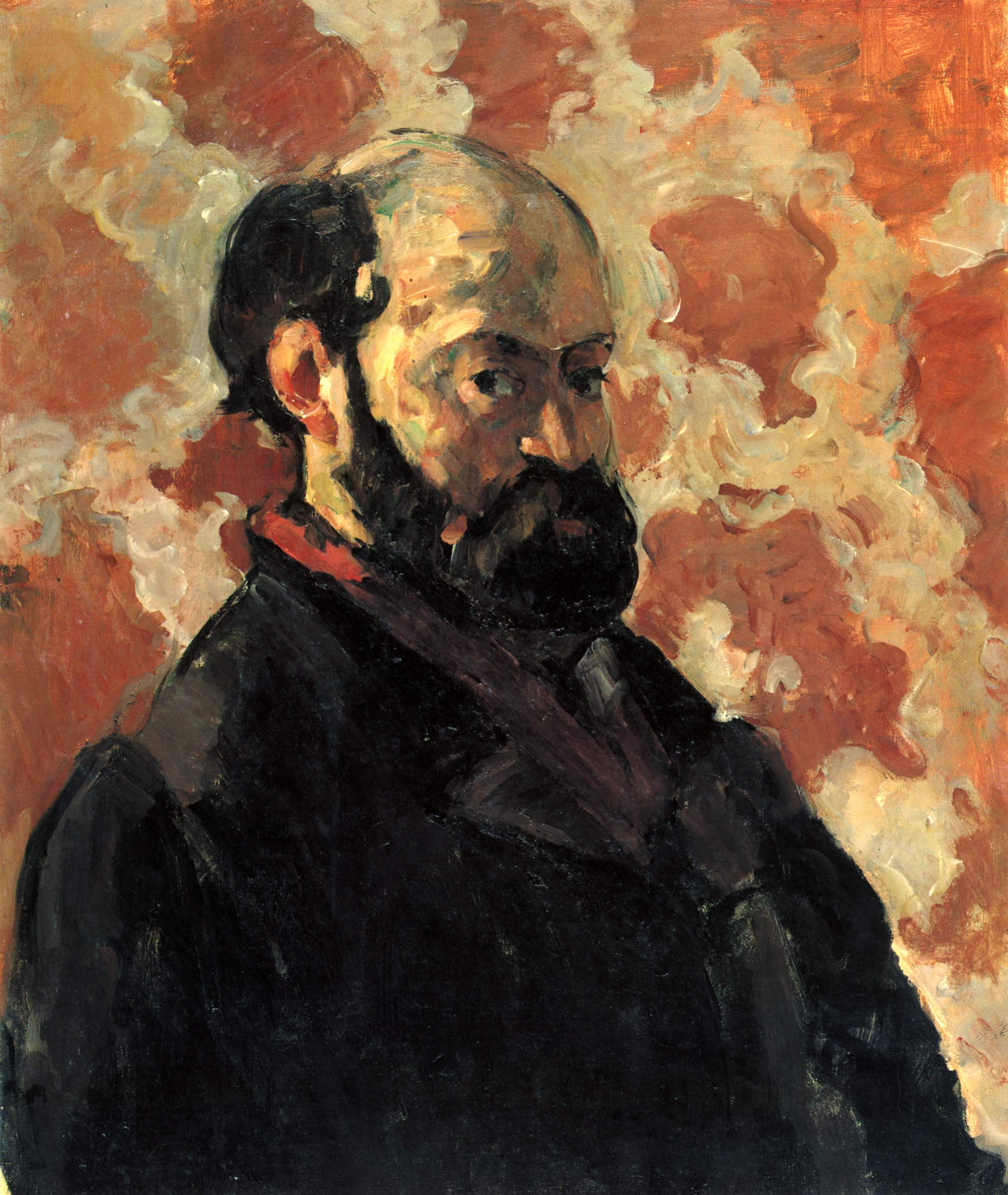
Self Portrait c. 1875

This is a complete list of the paintings by the French painter Paul Cézanne. The artistic career of Cézanne spanned more than forty years, from roughly 1860 to 1906, and formed a bridge between Impressionism and Post-Impressionism. Cézanne was one of a trio with Vincent van Gogh and Paul Gauguin that were underappreciated in their time but who would have an incalculable effect on the art of the twentieth century, providing an inspiration for artists such as Pablo Picasso and Henri Matisse. Picasso would go so far as to call Cézanne "The father of us all".

A prolific artist, he produced more than 900 oil paintings and 400 watercolours, including many incomplete works. The first complete catalogue of his work was authored by Lionello Venturi in 1936. Further catalogues were produced by John Rewald and an online catalogue by Walter Feilchenfeldt, David Nash and Jayne Warman.

== Paintings 1859–1870 ==
| Image | Title | Year | Dimensions | Location | Cat. No. |
|---|---|---|---|---|---|
| | Folding Screen with Pastoral Scenes and Decorations | c. 1859 | 250 × 402 cm | Private collection | V 3 R 1 FWN 560 |
| | Landscape with Mill | c. 1860 | 26 × 33 cm | Private collection | V 26; R 16; FWN 1-TA |
| | Landscape with Mill | c. 1860 | 28 × 35.5 cm | Private collection | V 28; R 17; FWN 2-TA |
| | Academic Nude | c. 1860 | 83 × 55 cm | Private collection | R 8 FWN 565-TA |
| | Young Girl in Meditation | c. 1860 | 29 × 18 cm | Private collection | R 10; FWN 566-TA |
| | Little Girl with Parrot | c. 1860 | 23 × 31 cm | Private collection | V 8 R 12; FWN 567-TA |
| | The Visitation | c. 1860 | 27 × 20 cm | Unknown | V 15; R 11; FWN 568-TA |
| | Horseman and Shepherd in a Mountainous Landscape | c. 1860 | 38 × 64 cm | Private collection | R 18; FWN 569-TA |
| | Interior Scene | c. 1860 | 46 × 38 cm | Unknown | V 9 R 14; FWN 570-TA |
| | According to Dubufe: The prisoner of Chillon | c. 1860 | Unknown | Unknown | R 13; FWN 571-TA |
| | The Kiss of the Muse (after Frillié) | c. 1860 | 82 × 66 cm | Musée Granet, Aix-en-Provence | V 11; R 9 FWN 572 |
| | The Two Children | c. 1860 | 55 × 46 cm | Private collection | V 10; R 15; FWN 573 |
| | The Four Seasons: Spring | 1860-61 | 314 × 97 cm | Petit Palais, Paris | V 4 R 4 FWN 561 |
| | The Four Seasons: Summer | 1860-61 | 314 × 109 cm | Petit Palais, Paris | V 5 R 5 FWN 562 |
| | The Four Seasons: Winter | 1860-61 | 314 × 104 cm | Petit Palais, Paris | V 7 R 6 FWN 563 |
| | The Four Seasons: Autumn | 1860-61 | 314 × 104 cm | Petit Palais, Paris | V 6 R 7 FWN 564 |
| | Religious Scene | 1860-62 | 27.5 × 22.2 cm | Pola Museum of Art, Kanagawa | V 13; R 20; FWN 577 |
| | Copper Objects and Vase of Flowers | 1860-62 | 41 × 47 cm | Private collection | R 19; FWN 700 |
| | Caesar's Tower | c. 1862 | 19 × 30 cm | Musée d'Orsay, Paris | V 32; R 24; FWN 3-TA |
| | Farmyard | c. 1862-64 | 26 × 33 cm | Private collection | V 31; R 25; FWN 4-TA |
| | The Farm | c. 1862-64 | 149 × 180 cm | Private collection | V 83; R 28; FWN 5 |
| | Waterfall | c. 1862-64 | 343 × 78 cm | Private collection | V 83; R30; FWN 6 |
| | Castle Entrance | 1862-64 | 153 × 260 cm | Private collection | R 31; FWN 7 |
| | The Keep | 1862-64 | 123 × 162 cm | Private collection | R 34; FWN 8 |
| | Sky between the Trees | 1862-64 | 142 × 88 cm | Private collection | R 35; FWN 9 |
| | The Boat | 1862-64 | 130 × 162 cm | Unknown | R 36; FWN 10 |
| | Trees by the River | 1862-64 | 154 × 89 cm | Unknown | R 37; FWN 11 |
| | Aquatic Plants | 1862-64 | 92 × 76 cm | Private collection | R 38; FWN 12 |
| | Landscape | 1862-64 | 46 × 38 cm | Private collection | R 43; FWN 13 |
| | Undergrowth | 1862-64 | 23 × 30 cm | Private collection | V 30; R 45; FWN 14-TA |
| | Provençal Farm Entrance | 1862-64 | 24 × 32.5 cm | Private collection | R 46; FWN 15-TA |
| | The Vault | 1862-64 | 43.5 × 41 cm | Private collection | R 44; FWN 17 |
| | Self-Portrait | 1862-64 | 44 × 32 cm | Private collection | V 1509; R 70; FWN 391 |
| | Self-Portrait | 1862-64 | 46 × 37 cm | Private collection | V 21; R 73; FWN 392 |
| | Portrait of Emile Zola | 1862-64 | 25.8 × 20 cm | Musée Granet, Aix-en-Provence | V 19; R 78; FWN 394 |
| | The Game of Hide and Seek (after Lancret) | 1862-64 | 165 × 218 cm | Nakata Museum, Onomichi City | V 14; R 23; FWN 574 |
| | Woman with a Parrot | 1862-64 | 28 × 20 cm | Private collection | V 99; R 26; FWN 575 |
| | Chained Figure | 1862-64 | 41 × 34 cm | Private collection | R 32; FWN 576-TA |
| | Judgment of Paris | 1862–1864 | 15 × 21 cm | Private collection | V 16; R 92; FWN 580-TA |
| | Fisher on the Rocks | 1862-64 | 36 × 87 cm | Private collection | R 39; FWN 581 |
| | Fisherwoman | 1862-64 | 55 × 70 cm | Unknown | R 40; FWN 582 |
| | Fisherman | 1862-64 | 61 × 68.5 cm | Unknown | R 41; FWN 583 |
| | Vase of Flowers | 1862-64 | Unknown | Unknown | R 21; FWN 701-TA |
| | Peaches in a Dish | 1862-64 | 18 × 24 cm | Private collection | V 12; R 22; FWN 702 |
| | Self-Portrait | 1862-64 | 44 × 37 cm | Private collection | V 18; R 72; FWN 390 |
| | View of the Colosseum in Rome (after FM Granet) | 1863-65 | Unknown | Unknown | R 27; FWN 18-TA |
| | Head of a Woman | 1864 | 46 × 38 cm | Private collection | V 22; R 75; FWN 395 |
| | The Alley of Jas de Bouffan | C. 1864 | 31 × 40 cm | Unknown | V 38; R 63; FWN 33-TA |
| | Head of a Man | 1865 | 41 × 33 cm | Detroit Institute of Arts | V 110; R 74; FWN 396 |
| | The Stove in the Studio | 1865 | 42 × 30 cm | National Gallery, London | V 64; R 90; FWN 703 |
| | Still Life with Bread and Eggs | 1865 | 59 × 76 cm | Cincinnati Art Museum | V 59; R 82; FWN 704 |
| | Landscape | c. 1865 | 26 × 39 cm | Unknown | V 35; R48; FWN 19-Ta |
| | Landscape | c. 1865 | 22.5 × 28.2 cm | Private collection | V 1510; R 53; FWN 20 |
| | Midday Landscape | c. 1865 | 24 × 38 cm | Private collection | V 36; R 49; FWN 21 |
| | Landscape | c. 1865 | 26.7 × 34.9 cm | Vassar College, Poughkeepsie | V 37; R 57; FWN 22 |
| | River Bend | c. 1865 | 33 × 41 cm | Barnes Foundation, Philadelphia | V 34; R 50; FWN 23 |
| | Landscape | c. 1865 | 20 × 21.5 cm | Private collection | R 51; FWN 24 |
| | The River in the Plain | c. 1865 | 27 × 34.3 cm | Private collection | V 41; R 61; FWN 25 |
| | Landscape | c. 1865 | 28 × 35 cm | Private collection | V 33; R 52; FWN 26 |
| | Landscape | c. 1865 | 32.5 × 45 cm | Private collection | R 55; FWN 27 |
| | River Bend | c. 1865 | 29 × 42 cm | Israel Museum, Jerusalem | R 54; FWN 28 |
| | Rocks at L'Estaque | c. 1865 | 21 × 33 cm | Israel Museum, Jerusalem | R 58; FWN 29 |
| | Landscape | c. 1865 | 19.5 × 29 cm | Unknown | R 60; FWN 30-TA |
| | Landscape around Aix-en-Provence | c. 1865 | 40.5 × 59.5 cm | Private collection | R 79; FWN 31 |
| | Self-Portrait with Long Hair | c. 1865 | 41 × 32 cm | Unknown (Presumed destroyed during WWII) | V 23; R 77; FWN 397-TA |
| | The Painter's Father, Louis-Auguste Cézanne | c. 1865 | 167.6 × 114.3 cm | National Gallery, London | V 25; R 95; FWN 398 |
| | Man Sitting Under a Tree | c. 1865 | 24.4 × 31.4 cm | Private collection | R 59; FWN 584-TA |
| | Bread and Leg of Lamb | c. 1865 | 27 × 35.5 cm | Kunsthaus Zürich | V 65; R 80; FWN 705 |
| | Le Lion et le bassin du Jas de Bouffan | 1865-66 | 23.5 × 30 cm | Unknown | V 39; R 64; FWN 34-TA |
| | Le Lion et le bassin du Jas de Bouffan | 1865-66 | 22 × 33 cm | Unknown | R 65; FWN 35-TA |
| | Landscape with the oratory and the Trois Sautets bridge | 1865-66 | 33 × 16 cm | Private collection | V 46; R 66; FWN 36 |
| | Mediterranean Landscape | 1865-66 | 22 × 31 cm | Private collection | R 67; FWN 37 |
| | Rocks at the Seashore | 1865-66 | 22 × 32 cm | Carnegie Museum of Art, Pittsburgh | V 1512; R 68; FWN 38 |
| | Rocks at L'Estaque | 1865-66 | 41 × 54 cm | Private collection | R 86; FWN 39-TA |
| | Sugar Bowl, Pears and Blue Cup | 1865-66 | 30 × 41 cm | Musée d'Orsay, Paris | V 62; R 93; FWN 706 |
| | Rocks in the Forest of Fontainebleau | 1865-68 | 41 × 33 cm | Private collection | R 126; FWN 40 |
| | The Bonnières Ferry | 1866 | 38 × 61 cm | Faure Museum, Aix-les-Bains | R 96; FWN 42 |
| | Portrait of Antony Valabrègue | 1866 | 116 × 98 cm | National Gallery of Art, Washington D.C. | V 126; R 94; FWN 399 |
| | Maron and Valabrègue Leaving for the Motif | 1866 | 39 × 31 cm | Museo Soumaya, Mexico City | V 96; R 99; FWN 400 |
| | The Artist's Father, Reading "L'Événement" | 1866 | 200 × 120 cm | National Gallery of Art, Washington, D.C. | V 91; R 101; FWN 402 |
| | Le Bassin du Jas de Bouffan | c. 1866 | 46 × 52 | Unknown | V 40; R 62; FWN 32-TA |
| | Bend in a Road in Provence | c. 1866 | 91 × 71 cm | Montreal Museum of Fine Arts | V 53; R 85; FWN 43 |
| | Clearing | c. 1866 | 19 × 39 cm | Unknown | V 43; R 69; FWN 44-TA |
| | Self-Portrait | c. 1866 | 45 × 41 | Private collection | V 81; R 116; FWN 403 |
| | Head of an Old Man (Père Rouvel at Bennecourt) | c. 1866 | 51 × 48 cm | Musée d'Orsay, Paris | V 17; R 97; FWN 414 |
| | Portrait of Marie Cézanne, the Artist's Sister | c. 1866 | 53.5 × 37 cm | Saint Louis Art Museum | V 89; R 119; FWN 418 |
| | The Promenade | c. 1866 | 28 × 36 cm | Private collection | V 116; R 87; FWN 589 |
| | Skull and Candlestick | c. 1866 | 47.5 × 62.5 cm | Private collection | V 61; R 83; FWN 707 |
| | Uncle Dominique in Profile | 1866-67 | 39.5 × 30.5 cm | Fitzwilliam Museum, Cambridge | V 80; R 111; FWN 404 |
| | Uncle Dominique | 1866-67 | 40.3 × 31.5 cm | Private collection | V 77; R 104; FWN 405 |
| | Uncle Dominique in a Cap | 1866-67 | 41 × 33 cm | Private collection | V 76; R 103; FWN 406 |
| | Uncxle Dominique in a Turban | 1866-67 | 44 × 37 cm | Private collection | V 82; R 105; FWN 407 |
| | Uncle Dominique | 1866-67 | 46 × 38 | Norton Simon Museum, Pasadena | V 79; R 102; 408 |
| | Uncle Dominique | 1866-67 | 48 × 35 cm | Private collection | V 75; R 105; FWN 409 |
| | Uncle Dominique as a Lawyer | 1866-67 | 62 × 52 cm | Musée d’Orsay, Paris | V 74; R 106; FWN 410 |
| | Portrait of Uncle Dominique as a Monk | 1866-67 | 64.8 × 54 cm | Metropolitan Museum of Art, New York City | V 72; R 108; 411 |
| | Portrait of Uncle Dominique in a Blue Cap | 1866-67 | 79.7 × 64.1 cm | Metropolitan Museum of Art, New York City | V 73; R 107; FWN 412 |
| | Portrait of a Man | 1866-67 | 81.5 × 66 cm | Am Römerholz, Winterthur | V 102; R 110; FWN 413 |
| | Portrait of a Woman | 1866-67 | 28.5 × 20.5 cm | Unknown | R 117; FWN 415-TA |
| | Portrait | 1866-67 | 65.2 × 54 cm | Private collection | V 95; R 112; FWN 416 |
| | Portrait of a Woman | 1866-67 | 51 × 39 cm | Private collection | V 78; R 118; FWN 417 |
| | Romantic Portrait | 1866-67 | 49.5 × 44.4 cm | Davis Museum at Wellesley College, Wellesley | V 97; R 113; FWN 419 |
| | Woman with Mirror | 1866-67 | 17 × 22 cm | Musée d'Orsay, Paris | V 111; R 127; FWN 594 |
| | The Abduction | 1867 | 90.5 × 117 cm | Fitzwilliam Museum, Cambridge | V 101; R 121; FWN 590 |
| | The Clearing | c. 1867 | 65 × 51 cm | Morohashi Museum of Modern Art, Fukushima | V 1514; R125; FWN 41 |
| | Landscape | c. 1867 | 14.5 × 21 | Private collection | R 91; FWN 45-TA |
| | Landscape | c. 1867 | 33 × 46 | Private collection | V 44; R 130; FWN 46 |
| | The Negro Scipion | c. 1867 | 107 × 83 cm | São Paulo Museum of Art | V 100; R 120; FWN 422 |
| | Love in Plaster | c. 1867 | 56.2 × 35.5 | Gallerie Bruno Bischofberger, Zürich | R 33; FWN 588-TA |
| | Nymphs and Satyrs | c. 1867 | 23.5 × 31 cm | Private collection | R 122; FWN 591 |
| | Satyrs and Nymphs | c. 1867 | 23 × 30 cm | Private collection | V 94; R 124; FWN 592 |
| | Women Dressing | c. 1867 | 22.5 × 33 cm | Private collection | V 93; R 123; FWN 593 |
| | The Orgy | c. 1867 | 130 × 81 cm | Private collection | V 92; R 128; FWN 596 |
| | The White Wall | 1867-68 | 22 × 37 cm | Private collection | V 1513; R 88; FWN 47 |
| | Railroad Cut | 1867-68 | 19.1 × 31.8 cm | Barnes Foundation, Philadelphia | V 42; R 89; FWN 48 |
| | Butcher's House in Montmartre | 1867-68 | 31.5 × 39.5 cm | Private collection | V 45; R 131; FWN 50 |
| | Leaning Boy | 1867-68 | 58 × 50 cm | Private collection | V 109; R 135; FWN 420 |
| | Portrait of Achille Emperaire | 1867–1868 | 42 × 40 cm | Private collection | V 85; R 141; FWN 421 |
| | Portrait of Achille Emperaire | 1867–1868 | 200 × 122 cm | Musée d'Orsay, Paris | V 88; R 139; FWN 423 |
| | Fishing Village at L'Estaque | 1867-69 | 42 × 55 cm | Philadelphia Museum of Art | V 55; R 134; FWN 49 |
| | Landscape with Factory near Aix | 1867-69 | 41 × 55 cm | Foundation E. G. Bührle, Zürich | V 58; R 132; FWN 51 |
| | The Black Marble Clock | 1867-69 | 54 × 74 cm | Private collection | V 69; R 136; FWN 708 |
| | Still Life with Kettle | 1867-69 | 63 × 80 cm | Musée d'Orsay, Paris | V 70; R 137; FWN 709 |
| | Jars, bottle, cup and fruits | 1867-69 | 64 × 80 cm | Alte Nationalgalerie, Berlin | V 71; R 138; FWN 710 |
| | Still Life with Bottle, Glass, and Lemon | 1867-69 | 35.5 × 27.3 cm | Yale University Art Gallery, New Haven | V 63; R 129; FWN 711 |
| | Bather and the Rocks | 1867-69 | 167.6 × 105.4 cm | Chrysler Museum of Art, Norfolk | V 83; R 29; FWN 900 |
| | Rocks | 1867-70 | 54.4 × 65.3 cm | Private collection | FWN 381 |
| | The Avenue at the Jas de Bouffan | 1868-70 | 37 × 44 cm | Tate Gallery, London | V 47; R 158; FWN 55 |
| | The Angler | 1868-70 | 27 × 36 | Unknown | V 115; R 162; FWN 604-TA |
| | Preparation for the Funeral (The Autopsy) | 1869 | 49 × 80 cm | Private collection | V 105; R 142; FWN 597 |
| | Christ in Limbo | c. 1869 | 170 × 97 cm | Musée d'Orsay, Paris | V 84; R 145; FWN 598 |
| | The Magdalen, or Sorrow | c. 1869 | 165 × 124 cm | Musée d'Orsay, Paris | V 86; R 146; FWN 599 |
| | Bather Standing, Drying her Hair | c. 1869 | 29 × 13 cm | Private collection | V 114; R 114; FWN 901 |
| | Portrait of Antony Valabrègue | 1869–70 | 60 × 50.2 cm | J. Paul Getty Museum, Los Angeles | V 127; R 147; FWN 425 |
| | The Overture to Tannhauser: The Artist's Mother and Sister | 1869-70 | 57 × 92 cm | Hermitage Museum, Saint Petersburg | V 90; R 149; FWN 600 |
| | Paul Alexis Reading at Zola's House | 1869–1870 | 52 × 56 cm | Private collection | V 118; R 150; FWN 601 |
| | Paul Alexis Reading to Émile Zola | 1869–1870 | 130 × 160 cm | São Paulo Museum of Art | V 117; R 151; FWN 602 |
| | Pastoral | 1870 | 65 × 81 cm | Musée d’Orsay, Paris | V 104; R 166; FWN 609 |
| | Provençal Landscape | c. 1870 | 59 × 78 | Private collection | V 54; R 133; FWN 52 |
| | L'Estaque, Melting Snow | c. 1871 | 73 × 92 cm | Foundation E.G. Bührle, Zurich | V 51; R 157; FWN 53 |
| | The Railway Cutting | c. 1870 | 80.4 × 129.4 cm | Neue Pinakothek, Munich | V 50; R 156; FWN 54 |
| | Landscape. Road with Trees in Rocky Mountains | c. 1870 | 53.7 × 65 cm | Städel, Frankfurt | R 168; FWN 56 |
| | Portrait of the Artist's Mother | c. 1870 | 53.5 × 37 | Saint Louis Art Museum | R 148; FWN 426 |
| | Portrait of Gustave Boyer | c. 1870 | 60 × 44 cm | Unknown | V 130; R 175; FWN 427-TA |
| | Portrait of Gustave Boyer | c. 1870 | 45.7 × 38 cm | National Gallery of Canada, Ottawa | V 132; R 176; FWN 428 |
| | Man with a Straw Hat (Portrait of Boyer) | c.1870 | 55 × 38.8 cm | Metropolitan Museum of Art, New York City | V 121; R 174; FWN 429 |
| | Portrait of Louis-Auguste Cézanne, the Artists Father | c. 1870 | 55 × 46 cm | Private collection | V 227; R 178; FWN 430 |
| | Contrasts | c. 1870 | 71 × 57 cm | Private collection | V 87; R 155; FWN 605 |
| | Two Women and a Child in an Interior | c. 1870 | 91 × 71 cm | Pushkin Museum, Moscow | V 24; R 154; FWN 606 |
| | Luncheon on the Grass | c. 1870 | 60 × 81 cm | Private collection | V 107; R 164; FWN 610 |
| | The Temptation of St. Antonius | c. 1870 | 57 × 76 cm | Foundation E.G. Bührle, Zürich | V 103; R 167; FWN 611 |
| | The Thieves and the Donkey | c. 1870 | 41 × 55 cm | Galleria d'Arte Moderna, Milan | V 108; R 163; FWN 612 |
| | The Murder | c. 1870 | 65 × 80 cm | Walker Art Gallery, Liverpool | V 121; R 165; FWN 613 |
| | A Modern Olympia | c. 1870 | 56 × 55 cm | Private collection | V 106; R 171; FWN 614 |
| | The Barque of Dante (after Delacroix) | c. 1870 | 25 × 33 cm | Private collection | V 125; R 172; FWN 615 |
| | Bathsheba (after Rembrandt) | c. 1870 | 37 × 45.5 cm | Private collection | R 173; FWN 616 |
| | Young Women with Loosened Hair | c. 1870 | 11 × 15.2 cm | Berggruen Museum, Berlin | V 277; R 230; FWN 627 |
| | Bathers | c. 1870 | 33 × 40 cm | Private collection | R 159; FWN 903 |
| | Reclining Men with Bathers | c. 1870 | 26.7 × 35 cm | Private collection | R 160; FWN 904-TA |

== Paintings 1871–1878 ==
| Image | Title | Year | Dimensions | Location | Cat. No. |
|---|---|---|---|---|---|
| | Portrait of Antoine-Fortuné Marion | 1870-71 | 40.6 × 32.5 cm | Kunstmuseum Basel | V 129; R 177; FWN 424 |
| | The Conversation | 1870-71 | 92 × 73 cm | Private collection | V 120; R 152; FWN 607 |
| | Bathers | 1870-71 | 20 × 40 cm | Private collection | V 113; R 161; FWN 902 |
| | The Courtesans | c. 1870-71 | 17.2 × 17.5 cm | Barnes Foundation, Philadelphia | V 122; R 144; FWN 603 |
| | The Promenade | 1871 | 56.5 × 47 cm | Private collectiom | V 119; R 153; FWN 608 |
| | Grove at Jas de Bouffan | c. 1871 | 35.5 × 54.5 cm | Private collection | V 159; R 234; FWN 57 |
| | The Route | c. 1871 | 59.8 × 72.4 cm | Kunstmuseum Basel | V 52; R 169; FWN 58 |
| | Landscape with Watermill | c. 1871 | 41.3 × 54.3 cm | Yale University Art Gallery, New Haven | V 48; R 183; FWN 59 |
| | L'Estaque, Evening Effect | c. 1871 | 44 × 60 cm | Louvre, Paris | V 57; R 170; FWN 60 |
| | Paris, quai de Jussieu | 1872 | 73 × 92 cm | Portland Art Museum | V 56; R 179; FWN 62 |
| | The Farmyard | c. 1872 | 46 × 38 cm | Unknown | V 1511; R 215; FWN 61-TA |
| | View of Louveciennes (after Pissaro) | c. 1872 | 73 × 92 cm | Private collection | V 153; R 184; FWN 63 |
| | Crossroads at Rue Rémy | c. 1872 | 38 × 45.5 cm | Musée d'Orsay, Paris | R 185; FWN 64 |
| | The Oil Mill | c. 1872 | 37 × 45 cm | Private collection | V 136; R 186; FWN 65 |
| | Portrait of Madame Cézanne | c. 1872 | 46 × 37.4 cm | Private collection | V 226; R 180; FWN 431-TA |
| | Woman Nursing her Child | c. 1872 | 22 × 22 cm | Private collection | V 233; R 216; FWN 618 |
| | Two Women with a White Dog | c. 1872 | 27 × 35 cm | Unknown | R 236; FWN 619-TA |
| | Bathers and Angler | c. 1872 | 14 × 21 cm | Private collection | V 1520A; R 231; FWN 905 |
| | Cottages in Auvers-sur-Oise | 1872-72 | 72.3 × 59.3 cm | Pola Museum of Art, Kanagawa | V 135; R 188; FWN 66 |
| | Fleurs dans un Vase | 1872–1873 | | Deji Art Museum, Nanjing | |
| | The Old Road in Auvers-sur-Oise | 1872–1873 | 55 × 46 cm | National Gallery of Canada, Ottawa | V 147; R 190; FWN 68 |
| | The Old Road in Auvers-sur-Oise | 1872–1873 | 46 × 55.3 cm | Musée d’Orsay, Paris | V 134; R 191; FWN 69 |
| | The House of Doctor Gachet in Auvers-sur-Oise | 1872–1873 | 46 × 38 cm | Musée d’Orsay, Paris | V 145; R 192; FWN 70 |
| | The House of Doctor Gachet in Auvers-sur-Oise | 1872–1873 | 61.6 × 51.1 cm | Yale University Art Gallery, New Haven | V 144; R 193; FWN 71 |
| | Village Road | 1872–1873 | 38 × 46 cm | Yale University Art Gallery, New Haven | V 141; R 187; FWN 74 |
| | The House of Dr. Gachet, Auver-sur-Oise | 1872–1873 | 56 × 47 cm | Private collection | V 146; R 194; FWN 75 |
| | Little Girl | 1872–1873 | 16 × 13 cm | Private collection | V 1520B; R 181; FWN 617 |
| | The Conversation | 1872–1873 | 44.5 × 53.2 cm | Private collection | V 231; R 235; FWN 620 |
| | Two Herrings | 1872–1873 | 32 × 40 cm | Unknown | V 60; R 207; FWN 713-TA |
| | Flowers and Fruits | 1872–1873 | 38 × 46 cm | Foundation E. G. Bührle, Zürich | R 212; FWN 714 |
| | Green Apples | 1872–1873 | 26 × 42 cm | Musée d'Orsay, Paris | V 66; R 213; FWN 715 |
| | Peach and Pear | 1872–1873 | 13.8 × 17 cm | Private collection | R 209; FWN 716-TA |
| | Flowers in a Glass Vase | 1872–1873 | 41 × 33 cm | Private collection | V 184; R 210; FWN 717 |
| | Bouquet with Yellow Dahlia | 1872–1873 | 54 × 64.5 cm | Musée d'Orsay, Paris | R 214; FWN 718 |
| | The Stream | 1872-75 | 16.5 × 22.5 cm | Private collection | R 241; FWN 624 |
| | Night Effect | 1873 | 38 × 46 cm | Unknown | V 137; R 195; FWN 72-TA |
| | Farm Entry, Auvers-sur-Oise | 1873 | 60 × 49 cm | Private collection | V 139; R 196; FWN 76 |
| | The House of Father Lacroix, Auvers-sur-Oise | 1873 | 61.5 × 51 cm | National Gallery of Art, Washington D.C. | V 138; R 201; FWN 77 |
| | Bouquet in a Delft Vase | 1873 | 41 × 27 cm | Musée d'Orsay, Paris | V 183; R 227; FWN 719 |
| | Geraniums and Larkspur in a Small Delft Vase | 1873 | 52 × 39 cm | Private collection | V 180; R 226; FWN 720 |
| | Dahlias in a Large Delft Vase | 1873 | 73 × 54 cm | Musée d'Orsay, Paris | V 179; R 223; FWN 721 |
| | Cottages in Auvers-sur-Oise in Winter | 1873 | 61 × 50 cm | Tokyo Fuji Art Museum | R 189; FWN 67 |
| | Road in a Forest | 1873 | 55.2 × 45.7 cm | Solomon R. Guggenheim Museum, New York City | V 140; R 197; FWN 73 |
| | The Four Districts in Auvers-sur-Oise | c. 1873 | 46.3 × 55.2 cm | Philadelphia Museum of Art | V 157; R 198; FWN 78 |
| | Auvers-sur-Oise Seen through the Trees | c. 1873 | 48 × 58 cm | Disappeared during World War II | V 151; R 199; FWN 79-TA |
| | View of Auvers | c. 1873 | 44.5 × 34.5 cm | Private collection | V 149; R 200; FWN 80 |
| | The Hanged Man's House | c. 1873 | 55 × 66 cm | Musée d'Orsay, Paris | V 133; R 202; FWN 81 |
| | Standing Man | c. 1873 | 24 × 11 cm | Unknown | R 243; FWN 623-TA |
| | Small houses in Pontoise, near Auvers-sur-Oise | 1873-74 | 40.5 × 54.5 cm | Harvard Art Museums, Cambridge | V 156; R 220; FWN 82 |
| | Panoramic View of Auvers | 1873-74 | 65 × 80 cm | Art Institute of Chicago | V 150; R 221; FWN 83 |
| | Village on the Banks of the Oise | 1873-74 | 73.5 × 93 cm | Private collection | V 152; R 224; FWN 84 |
| | Portrait of Madame Cézanne | 1873-74 | 46 × 38 cm | Private collection | V 278; R 217; FWN 432 |
| | The Well Driller | 1873-74 | 20.5 × 16 cm | Barnes Foundation, Philadelphia | V 1520; R 229; FWN 622 |
| | The Fishing Party | 1873-74 | 27 × 33 | Unknown | V 230; R 246; FWN 625-TA |
| | Picnic on a Riverbank | 1873-74 | 26.5 × 34 | Yale University Art Gallery, New Haven | R 245; FWN 626 |
| | A Modern Olympia | 1873–1874 | 46 × 55 cm | Musée d’Orsay, Paris | V 225; R 225; FWN 628 |
| | Hamlet and Horatio | 1873-74 | 21.9 × 19.4 cm | Private collection | R 232; FWN 629 |
| | The House and the Tree | c. 1874 | 65 × 54 cm | Private collection | V 142; R 222; FWN 85 |
| | The Temptation of Saint Anthony | c, 1874 | 25 × 33 cm | Kasama Nichidō Museum of Art | V 240; R 240; FWN 630 |
| | Portrait of Antony Valabrègue | 1874-75 | 64.1 × 52.8 cm | Pola Museum of Art, Kanagawa | V 128; R 218; FWN 433 |
| | Three Bathers | 1874-75 | 19 × 22 cm | Musée d’Orsay, Paris | V 128; R 218; FWN 918 |
| | The Painter | c. 1874-75 | 24 × 34 cm | Denver Art Museum | V 237; R 233; FWN 631 |
| | Man with a Vest | 1874-76 | 32.5 × 25 cm | Barnes Foundation, Philadelphia | V 248; R 228; FWN 621 |
| | Portrait of Paul, the Artist's Son | 1875 | 17 × 15 cm | Princeton University Art Museum | R 464; FWN 456 |
| | Landscape with Bell Tower | c. 1875 | 65 × 54 cm | White House Collection, Washington D.C. | R 264; FWN 86 |
| | Self-portrait | c. 1875 | 64 × 53 cm | Musée d'Orsay, Paris | V 288; R 182; FWN 434 |
| | Self-Portrait in a Casquette | c. 1875 | 53 × 38 cm | Hermitage Museum, Saint Petersburg | V 289; R 219; FWN 435 |
| | Self-Portrait with Pink Background | c. 1875 | 66 × 55 cm | Musée d’Orsay, Paris | V 286; R 274; FWN 436 |
| | Don Quichotte | c. 1875 | 35 × 24 cm | Private collection | V 246; R 238; FWN 632 |
| | Don Quichotte, seen from behind | c. 1875 | 22.5 × 16.5 cm | Private collection | V 244; R 239; FWN 633 |
| | The Fishermen | c. 1875 | 54.5 × 81.5 cm | Metropolitan Museum of Art, New York City | V 243; R 237; FWN 634 |
| | Two Apples | c. 1875 | 15 × 24 cm | Private collection | V 506; R 352; FWN 723 |
| | Two Pears | c. 1875 | 16.5 × 24 cm | Private collection | V 505; R 353; FWN 724 |
| | Bather at the Seashore | c. 1875 | 23.5 × 22 cm | Barnes Foundation, Philadelphia | V 256; R 248; FWN 906 |
| | Five Bathers under Trees | c. 1875 | 60 × 73 cm | Private collection | V 264; R 257; FWN 917 |
| | Three Bathers | c. 1875 | 30.5 × 33 cm | Private collection | V 267; R 361; FWN 920 |
| | Trees at the Jas de Bouffan | 1875-76 | 55.5 × 73.5 cm | Portland Art Museum | V 161; R 267; FWN 88 |
| | View from the Jas de Bouffan | 1875-76 | 44.5 × 59 | Musée d’Orsay, Paris | V 1516; R 270; FWN 94 |
| | Povençal Landscape | 1875-76 | 72 × 58 cm | Musée de l'Orangerie, Paris | V 163; R 273; FWN 95 |
| | Landscape | 1875-76 | 46 × 55 cm | Private collection | V 305; R 272; FWN 98 |
| | The Road | 1875-76 | 50 × 65 cm | Auckland Art Gallery | V 158; R 275; FWN 102 |
| | The Strangled Woman | 1875-76 | 31 × 25 cm | Musée d’Orsay, Paris | V 123; R 247; FWN 636 |
| | Bathers | 1875-76 | 38.1 × 46 cm | Metropolitan Museum of Art, New York City | V 265; R 256; FWN 916 |
| | Bathers at Rest | 1875-76 | 38 × 45.8 cm | Museum of Art and History, Geneva | V 273; R 259; FWN 924 |
| | Bathers at Rest | 1875-76 | 38 × 46 cm | Unknown | V 274; R 260; FWN 925-TA |
| | Houses Floating on a River | 1875-77 | 58 × 72 cm | White House Collection, Washington D.C. | R 266; FWN 87 |
| | Road in Pontoise | 1875–1877 | 58 × 71 cm | Pushkin Museum, Moscow | V 172; R 310; FWN 100 |
| | Nude Woman Lying | 1875-77 | 8.5 × 13 cm | Private collection | V 279; R 242; FWN 635 |
| | The Rococo Vase | 1875-77 | 73 × 60 cm | National Gallery of Art, Washington D.C. | V 222; R 265; FWN 722 |
| | Swimmers | 1875-77 | 14 × 19 cm | Private collection | V 275; R 251; FWN 909 |
| | Swimmers | c. 1875-77 | 19 × 27 cm | Private collection | V 272; R 250; FWN 908 |
| | Harvesters | 1875-78 | 26 × 41 cm | Private collection | V 1517; R 454; FWN 659-TA |
| | The Sea at L'Estaque | 1876 | 42 × 59 cm | National Gallery, London | V 168; R 279; FWN 96 |
| | Landscape - Edge of a Wood | 1876 | 60 × 50 cm | Private collection | V 169; R 276; FWN 103 |
| | Chestnut Trees at the Jas de Bouffan Farm | c. 1876 | 51 × 65 cm | Private collection | V 464; R 268; FWN 90 |
| | The Pond at the Jas de Bouffan | c. 1876 | 46 × 55 cm | Graves Art Gallery, Sheffield | V 160; R 294; FWN 91 |
| | The Pool at Jas de Bouffan | c. 1876 | 46.1 × 56.3 cm | Hermitage Museum, Saint Petersburg | V 167; R 278; FWN 92 |
| | At Jas de Bouffan | c. 1876 | 60 × 73 cm | Private collection | V 413; R 271; FWN 93 |
| | The Village of L'Estaque Seen from the Sea | c. 1876 | 44 × 81 cm | Barnes Foundation, Philadelphia | V 293; R 280; FWN 101 |
| | Bather with Outstrectched Arms | c. 1876 | 24 × 14 cm | Rose Art Museum, Waltham | V 262; R 252; FWN 910 |
| | Bather with Outstrectched Arms | c. 1876 | 23 × 15 cm | Private collection | V 271; R 253; FWN 911-TA |
| | Bather with Outstrectched Arms | c. 1876 | 24 × 16 cm | Private collection | V 259; R 255; FWN 912-TA |
| | Bather Sitting at the Edge of the Water | c. 1876 | 29 × 21 cm | Kunstmuseum Basel | V 260; R 263; FWN 927 |
| | Bather Standing | c. 1876 | 30 × 17 cm | Private collection | V 261; R 262; FWN 929 |
| | Auvers-sur-Oise and Environs | 1876-77 | 60 × 50 cm | Private collection | V 171; R 277; FWN 99 |
| | Group of Houses | 1876-77 | 50 × 60 cm | Villa Flora, Winterthur | V 1515; R 295; FWN 105 |
| | Portrait of Victor Chocquet | 1876–1877 | 46 × 36 cm | Private collection | V 283; R 292; FWN 437 |
| | The Pond | 1876-77 | 44.5 × 53.5 cm | Museum of Fine Arts, Boston | V 232; R 244; FWN 637 |
| | The Gathering | 1876-77 | 15.5 × 22.5 cm | Private collection | R 284; FWN 638 |
| | The Camping Party | 1876-77 | 17 × 26 cm | Private collection | V 234; R 286; FWN 639 |
| | The Luncheon on the Grass | 1876-77 | 21 × 26 cm | Musée de l'Orangerie, Paris | V 238; R 287; FWN 640 |
| | Life in the Fields | 1876-77 | 26 × 35 cm | Private collection | V 251; R 282; FWN 641 |
| | The Fountain | 1876-77 | 12.6 × 18.5 cm | Private collection | R 283; FWN 642 |
| | The Bowls Players | 1876-77 | 17 × 23 cm | Unknown | V 236; R 285; FWN 643-TA |
| | Drunks | 1876-77 | 40 × 50 cm | Tel Aviv Museum of Art | V 235; R 288; FWN 644 |
| | Afternoon in Naples | 1876-77 | 14 × 24 cm | Unknown | V 112; R 289; FWN 645-TA |
| | Afternoon in Naples | 1876-77 | 30 × 40 cm | Private collection | V 223; R 290; FWN 646 |
| | L'Après-midi à Naples | 1875 | 37 × 45 cm | National Gallery of Australia, Canberra | V 224; R 291; FWN 647 |
| | The Tiger | 1876-77 | 29 × 37 cm | Unknown | V 250; R 298; FWN 648-TA |
| | Bathers | 1876-77 | 24.8 × 34.3 cm | Private collection | V 269; R 358; FWN 919-TA |
| | Four Bathers | 1876-77 | 27.1 × 35 cm | Barnes Foundation, Philadelphia | V 386; R 362; FWN 921 |
| | Three Bathers | 1876-77 | 25.4 × 33.7 cm | Barnes Foundation, Philadelphia | V 270; R 359; FWN 922 |
| | Three Bathers | 1876-77 | 52 × 54.5 cm | Petit Palais, Paris | V 381; R 360; FWN 923 |
| | Five Bathers | 1876-77 | 24 × 25 cm | Musée d'Orsay, Paris | V 268; R 254; FWN 934 |
| | Seated Bather | c. 1876-77 | 19.5 × 12 cm | Columbus Museum of Art | V 258; R 249; FWN 907 |
| | Bathers at Rest | c. 1876–1877 | 82.2 × 101.2 | Barnes Foundation, Philadelphia | V 276; R 261; FWN 926 |
| | The House of the Jas de Bouffan | 1876-78 | 59 × 71 cm | Private collection | V 415; R 269; FWN 89 |
| | The Seine at quai d'Austerlitz (after Guillaumin) | 1876-78 | 59 × 72 cm | Hamburger Kunsthalle | V 242; R 293; FWN 104 |
| | The Sea at L'Estaque | c. 1876-79 | 55.5 × 65.5 cm | Memorial Art Gallery, Rochester | V 408; R 394; FWN 97 |
| | The Etang des Soeurs, Osny, near Pontoise | 1877 | 60 × 73.5 cm | Courtauld Gallery, London | V 174; R 307; FWN 106 |
| | Maubuisson Garden, Pontoise | 1877 | 50 × 61 cm | Private collection | V 170; R 311; FWN 109 |
| | Portrait Of Victor Chocquet Seated | 1877 | 46 × 38 cm | Columbus Museum of Art | V 373; R 296; FWN 439 |
| | Still Life With Soup Tureen | 1877 | 65 × 83 cm | Musée d'Orsay, Paris | V 494; R 302; FWN 726 |
| | The Côte Saint-Denis, at Pontoise | c. 1877 | 66 × 54.5 cm | Private collection | V 173; R 315; FWN 107 |
| | Rue du Fond-de-l'Hermitage, Hermitage district, Pontoise | c. 1877 | 60 × 73 cm | Museum Langmatt Sidney and Jenny Brown Foundation, Baden | V 143; R 308; FWN 108 |
| | Turning Road | c. 1877 | 48 × 59 cm | Private collection | V 177; R 388; FWN 110 |
| | Portrait of Victor Chocquet | c. 1877 | 35.2 × 27.3 cm | Virginia Museum of Fine Arts, Richmond | V 375; R 297; FWN 438 |
| | Woman in a White Cap | c. 1877 | 48 × 40 cm | Unknown | V 285; R 309; FWN 440-TA |
| | Portrait of Madame Cézanne | c. 1877 | 26 × 31 cm | Private collection | V 228; R 387; FWN 441 |
| | Portrait of the Artist's Wife Sewing | c. 1877 | 59.5 × 49.5 cm | Nationalmuseum, Stockholm | V 291; R 323; FWN 442 |
| | Madame Cézanne in a Red Armchair | 1877 | 73 × 56 cm | Museum of Fine Arts, Boston | V 292; R 324; FWN 443 |
| | Self-Portrait | c. 1877 | 26 × 15 cm | Musée d'Orsay, Paris | V 371; R 385; FWN 444 |
| | Selp-Portrait | c. 1877 | 61 × 47 cm | The Phillips Collection, Washington D.C. | V 290; R 383; FWN 449 |
| | The Eternal Feminine | c. 1877 | 45 × 53 cm | J. Paul Getty Museum, Los Angeles | V 247; R 299; FWN 649 |
| | The Temptation of Saint Anthony | 1877 | 47 × 56 cm | Musée d’Orsay, Paris | V 241; R 300; FWN 650 |
| | The Reaper | c. 1877 | 45.7 × 55.2 cm | Private collection | V 249; R 301; FWN 651 |
| | Two Apples and a Glass | c. 1877 | 20 × 18 cm | Unknown | R 306; FWN 725-TA |
| | Overturned Basket of Fruit | c. 1877 | 16 × 32.3 cm | Kelvingrove Art Gallery and Museum, Glasgow | V 211; R 303; FWN 727 |
| | Four Apples on a Plate | c. 1877 | 15 × 31 cm | Private collection | V 205; R 304; FWN 728 |
| | Fruit and Powder Box | c. 1877 | 24 × 33.5 cm | Museum Langmatt Sidney and Jenny Brown Foundation, Baden | V 1606; R 305; FWN 729 |
| | Two Vases of Flowers | c. 1877 | 56 × 46.3 cm | Private collection | V 217; R 313; FWN 730 |
| | Flowers in a Vase | c. 1877 | 56 × 46 cm | Hermitage Museum, St. Petersburg | V 182; R 315; FWN 732 |
| | Vase of Flowers on a Flower Carpet | c. 1877 | 61 × 50 cm | Private collection | V 181; R 316; FWN 733 |
| | Vase of Flowers | c. 1877 | 37 × 32 cm | Private collection | V 215; R 317; FWN 734 |
| | Vase of Flowers on a Round Table | c. 1877 | 49 × 36 cm | Unknown | V 216; R 318; FWN 735-TA |
| | Still Life with Glass, Cup and Fruit | c. 1877 | 41.5 × 55 cm | Private collection | V 186; R 319; FWN 736 |
| | Still Life with Jar, Cup, and Apples | c. 1877 | 60.6 × 73.7 cm | Metropolitan Museum of Art, New York City | V 213; R 322; FWN 737 |
| | Still Life with Flask, Glass and Jug | c. 1877 | 46 × 55 cm | Solomon R. Guggenheim Museum, New York City | V 214; R 326; FWN 738 |
| | Apples and Biscuits | c. 1877 | 37.5 × 55.2 cm | Private collection | V 212; R 327; FWN 739 |
| | Plate of Apples | c. 1877 | 45.8 × 54.7 cm | Art Institute of Chicago | V 210; R 328; FWN 740 |
| | Plate with Fruits and Biscuits | c. 1877 | 53 × 63 cm | Private collection | V 209; R 325; FWN 741 |
| | Landscape | 1877-78 | 53.5 × 64.5 cm | Private collection | V 295; R 382; FWN 111 |
| | Self-Portrait | 1877-78 | 24 × 18 cm | Kunstmuseum Bern | V 280; R 386; FWN 445 |
| | Vase of Flowers | 1877-78 | 31 × 36.4 cm | Private collection | V 199; R 314; FWN 731 |
| | Pears and Knife | 1877-78 | 20.5 × 31 cm | Private collection | V 349; R 347; FWN 753 |
| | Seven Apples | 1877-78 | 17 × 36 cm | Private collection | R 333; FWN 755 |
| | Five Apples | 1877-78 | 12.7 × 25.5 cm | Private collection | V 191; R 334; FWN 756 |
| | Bather with Raised Arm | c. 1877-78 | 33 × 24 cm | Private collection | V 544; R 369; FWN 913 |
| | Bather with Raised Arm | c. 1877-78 | 73 × 60 cm | Private collection | V 549; R 370; FWN 914 |
| | Bather from the Back | 1877–1878 | 24 × 19 cm | Private collection | R 368; FWN 928 |
| | Bather | 1877-78 | 32 × 22 cm | Private collection | V 263; R 450; FWN 930 |
| | Bather | 1877-78 | 22 × 14 cm | Kubosō Memorial Museum of Arts, Izumi | V 257; R 367; FWN 937 |
| | Four Bathers | 1877–1878 | 38 × 46.2 cm | Pola Museum of Art, Kanagawa | V 384; R 363; FWN 938 |
| | Five Bathers | 1877–1878 | 40.6 × 42.9 cm | Barnes Foundation, Philadelphia | V 383; R 364; FWN 939 |
| | Five Bathers | 1877–1878 | 45.5 × 55 cm | Musée Picasso, Paris | V 385; R 365; FWN 940 |
| | Five Bathers | 1877–1878 | 38 × 41 cm | Private collection | V 382; R 366; FWN 941 |
| | View of the Bay of Marseille from the Village of Saint-Henri | 1877-79 | 66.5 × 83 cm | Yamagata Museum of Art | V 398; R 281; FWN 118 |
| | Apples and Cakes | 1877-79 | 46 × 55 cm | Private collection | V 196; R 329; FWN 744 |
| | Still Life with a Dessert | 1877-79 | 59 × 73 cm | Philadelphia Museum of Art | V 197; R 337; FWN 745 |
| | The Buffet | 1877–1879 | 65.5 × 81 cm | Museum of Fine Arts, Budapest | V 208; R 338; FWN 746 |
| | Grapes and Peach on a Plate | 1877-79 | 16.6 × 29.5 cm | Barnes Foundation, Philadelphia | V 192; R 342; FWN 747 |
| | Apricots and Cherries on a Plate | 1877-79 | 16 × 22 cm | Private collection | V 193; R 341; FWN 749 |
| | Still Life with Open Drawer | 1877–1879 | 33 × 41 cm | Musée d'Orsay, Paris | V 495; R 343; FWN 750 |
| | Still Life with Apples and a Glass of Wine | 1877-79 | 26.2 × 32.5 cm | Philadelphia Museum of Art | R 344; FWN 751 |
| | Apples | 1877-79 | 22.9 × 33 cm | Metropolitan Museum of Art, New York | V 508; R 340; FWN 758 |

== Paintings 1878–1890 ==
| Image | Title | Year | Dimensions | Location | Cat. No. |
|---|---|---|---|---|---|
| | The Basin of the Jas de Bouffan in Winter | c. 1878 | 47 × 56.2 cm | Private collection | V 164; R 350; FWN 112 |
| | The Pool at the Jas de Bouffan | c. 1878 | 73.7 × 59.7 cm | Albright–Knox Art Gallery, Buffalo | V 417; R 380; FWN 116 |
| | Landscape at Jas de Bouffan | c. 1878 | 46 × 55 cm | Private collection | V 162; R 381; FWN 117 |
| | Portrait of the Artist's Son | c. 1878 | 21 × 15.2 cm | Private collection | V 281; R 466; FWN 457 |
| | Vénus et l'Amour | c. 1878 | 21 × 21 cm | Private collection | V 124; R 374; FWN 652 |
| | Scène Légendaire | c. 1878 | 47 × 55 cm | Private collection | V 239; R 371; FWN 653 |
| | Departure on the Water | c. 1878 | 25.5 × 33 cm | Private collection | V 378; R 372; FWN 654 |
| | Still Life with Seven Apples | c. 1878 | 19 × 27 cm | Fitzwilliam Museum, Cambridge | V 190; R 346; FWN 760 |
| | Apples on a Chair | c. 1878 | 23.2 × 39.7 cm | Rhode Island School of Design Museum, Providence | R 336; FWN 761 |
| | Abandoned House | 1878-79 | 49 × 58.5 cm | Private collection | V 659; R 351; FWN 113 |
| | Maison de Bellevue on the Hill | 1878-79 | 53.5 × 64 cm | Private collection | V 412; R 377; FWN 114 |
| | The Dolphin in the Basin at the Jas de Bouffan | 1878-79 | 58 × 71 cm | Unknown | V 166; R 379; FWN 115-TA |
| | The Sea at L'Estaque | 1878-79 | 73 × 92 cm | Musée Picasso, Paris | V 425; R 395; FWN 120 |
| | The Sea at L'Estaque | 1878-79 | 46 × 55 cm | Private collection | V 427; R 396; FWN 121 |
| | The Sea at L'Estaque | 1878-79 | 38 × 46 cm | Museum Langmatt Sidney and Jenny Brown Foundation, Baden | V 426; R 392; FWN 122 |
| | Bottom of the Ravine | 1878-79 | 73 × 54 cm | Museum of Fine Arts, Houston | V 400; R 393; FWN 123 |
| | Toward Mont Sainte-Victoire | 1878-79 | 46.4 × 55.2 cm | Barnes Foundation, Philadelphia | V 424; R 397; FWN 126 |
| | The Plain by Mont Sainte-Victoire | 1878-79 | 58 × 72 cm | Pushkin Museum, Moscow | V 423; R 398; FWN 127 |
| | The Star Ridge with the King's Peak | 1878-79 | 49.2 × 59 cm | Kelvingrove Art Gallery and Museum, Glasgow | V 418; R 399; FWN 128 |
| | Self-Portrait in a Straw Hat | 1878-79 | 34 × 26 cm | Museum of Modern Art, New York | V 287; R 384; FWN 446 |
| | Fruit Bowl with Apples and Pears | 1878-79 | 25 × 39 cm | Private collection | V 194; R 331; FWN 752 |
| | Three Pears | 1878-79 | 20.5 × 26 cm | National Gallery of Art, Washington D.C. | V 201; R 345; FWN 754 |
| | Two and a Half Apples | 1878-79 | 16.5 × 10 cm | Barnes Foundation, Philadelphia | V 202; R 330; FWN 757 |
| | Seven Apples | 1878-79 | 17 × 24 cm | Cantonal Museum of Fine Arts, Lausanne | V 195; R 332; FWN 759 |
| | The Gulf of Marseille Seen from L'Estaque | 1878-79 | 59.5 × 73 cm | Musée d'Orsay, Paris | V 428; R 390; FWN 119 |
| | Luncheon on the Grass | 1878-80 | 34 × 39 cm | Unknown | V 377; R 373; FWN 655-TA |
| | Flower Pot on a Table | 1878-70 | 60 × 73 cm | Private collection | V 357; R 349; FWN 743 |
| | Madeame Cézanne with a Fan | 1879 | 92.5 × 73 cm | Foundation E. G. Bührle, Zürich | V 369; R 606; FWN 447 |
| | Madeame Cézanne Seated | 1879 | 55 × 46 cm | Private collection | V 577; R 411; FWN 452 |
| | Mountains in Provence | c. 1879 | 53.5 × 72.4 cm | National Museum Cardiff | V 490; R 391; FWN 124 |
| | Landscape | c. 1879 | 46 × 55 cm | Wallraf–Richartz Museum, Cologne | V 299; R 378; FWN 125-TA |
| | Farmyard | c. 1879 | 63 × 52 cm | Musée d'Orsay, Paris | V 326; R 389; FWN 129 |
| | The Alley | c. 1879 | 73.5 × 60.5 cm | Gothenburg Museum of Art | R 409; FWN 130 |
| | Path at the Entrance to the Forest | c. 1879 | 55 × 45.5 cm | Private collection | V 320; R 375; FWN 131 |
| | Undergrowth | c. 1879 | 55 × 46 cm | Fitzwilliam Museum, Cambridge | V 314; R 376; FWN 132 |
| | Landscape | c. 1879 | 54 × 73 cm | Foundation E. G. Bührle, Zürich | V 306; V 412; FWN 135 |
| | Village behind Trees, Ile-de-France | c. 1879 | 55.8 × 46.3 cm | Private collection | V 165; R 403; FWN 136 |
| | House in the Trees | c. 1879 | 92 × 73 cm | Private collection | V 148; R 402; FWN 137 |
| | House in the Country | c. 1879 | 57 × 73 cm | Wadsworth Atheneum, Hartford | V 331; R 408; FWN 138 |
| | Landscape with Waterline | c. 1879 | 46 × 55 cm | Private collection | V 309; R 404; FWN 139 |
| | The Spring House | c. 1879 | 60.4 × 50 cm | Barnes Foundation, Philadelphia | V 310; R 406; FWN 140 |
| | Landscape near Melun | c. 1879 | 60 × 73 cm | National Gallery, Oslo | V 304; R 405; FWN 141 |
| | Dish of Apples | c. 1879 | 45.5 × 55 cm | Metropolitan Museum of Art, New York | V 207; R 348; FWN 742 |
| | Bowl and Milk Jug | c. 1879 | 20 × 18 cm | Artizon Museum, Tokyo | V 220; R 425; FWN 765 |
| | Landscape with Road and Steeple | 1879-80 | 54.5 × 65 cm | Private collection | V 416; R 400; FWN 133 |
| | View of Auvers-sur-Oise | 1879-80 | 46 × 55 cm | Unknown, stolen from the Ashmolean Museum | V 323; R 401; FWN 134 |
| | Poplars | 1879-80 | 65 × 80 cm | Musée d'Orsay, Paris | V 335; R 407; FWN 142 |
| | Maincy Bridge | 1879-80 | 58.5 × 72.5 cm | Musée d'Orsay, Paris | V 396; R 436; FWN 143 |
| | Melun seen from Le Mée-sur-Seine | 1879-80 | 59.7 × 73 cm | Private collection | V 307; R 414; FWN 144 |
| | Melting Snow, Fontainebleau | 1879-80 | 73.6 × 100.6 cm | Museum of Modern Art, New York | V 336; R 413; FWN 145 |
| | The Church of Saint-Aspais Seen from the Place de la Préfecture at Melun | 1879-80 | 53 × 64.4 cm | Barnes Foundation, Philadelphia | V 321; R 495; FWN 170 |
| | Portrait of Louis Guillaume | 1879–1880 | 56 × 47 cm | National Gallery of Art, Washington, D.C. | V 374; R 421; FWN 448 |
| | Self-Portrait | 1879–1880 | 33.5 × 24.5 cm | Am Römerholz, Winterthur | V 367; R 416; FWN 450 |
| | Self-Portrait | 1879–1880 | 65 × 51 cm | Museum of Fine Arts Bern | V 366; R 415; FWN 451 |
| | Madame Cézanne in the Garden | 1879-80 | 88 × 66 cm | Musée de l'Orangerie, Paris | V 370; R 462; FWN 455 |
| | The Satyrs | 1879-80 | 42 × 55 cm | Private collection | V 379; R 455; FWN 656 |
| | Glass and Pears | 1879-80 | 18 × 38 cm | Private collection | V 351; R 422; FWN 748 |
| | Plate of Fruit on a Chair | 1879-80 | 20.7 × 37.2 cm | Barnes Foundation, Philadelphia | V 352; R 335; FWN 762 |
| | Apples and Laundry | 1879-80 | 25 × 44 cm | Private collection | V 203; R 339; FWN 763 |
| | Pears on a White Plate | 1879-80 | 18.8 × 38 | Private collection | V 350; R 357; FWN 764 |
| | Still Life with Bowl | 1879-80 | 15.7 × 20 cm | Private collection | FWN 766 |
| | Still Life in Blue with Lemon | 1879-80 | 18.5 × 29.5 cm | Cincinnati Art Museum | V 219; R 428; FWN 767 |
| | Still Life with Carafe, Milk Can, Bowl, and Orange | 1879-80 | 26 × 35 cm | Dallas Museum of Art | V 340; R 430; FWN 768 |
| | Milk-Jug and Lemon | 1879-80 | 22.2 × 44 cm | Rosengart Collection Museum, Lucerne | V 221; R 429; FWN 769 |
| | Milk-Jug, Caraffe and Bowl | 1879-80 | 45 × 54 cm | Hermitage Museum, St. Petersburg | V 337; R 427; FWN 770 |
| | Milk Can and Apples | 1879-80 | 50 × 61 cm | Museum of Modern Art, New York City | V 338; R 426; FWN 771 |
| | Some Apples | 1879-80 | 18 × 23 cm | Stiftung Langmatt Sidney and Jenny Brown, Baden | V 355; R 354; FWB 772 |
| | Apples and Biscuits | 1879-80 | 46 × 55 cm | Musée de l'Orangerie, Paris | V 343; R 431; FWN 773 |
| | Apples, Pears and Grapes | 1879-80 | 37 × 44 cm | Hermitage Museum, St. Petersburg | V 345; R 432; FWN 774 |
| | Peaches and Pears | 1879-80 | 28 × 22.7 cm | Private collection | V 353; R 433; FWN 775 |
| | Fruits on a Blue Plate | 1879-80 | 19 × 38 cm | National Gallery Prague | V 348; R 356; FWN 776 |
| | Plate of Peaches | 1879-80 | 59.7 × 73.3 cm | Solomon R. Guggenheim Museum, New York City | V 347; R 423; FWN 777 |
| | Apples and Serviette | 1879-80 | 49.2 × 60.3 cm | Sompo Japan Museum of Art, Tokyo | V 346; R 417; FWN 778 |
| | Glass and Apples | 1879-80 | 31.5 × 40 cm | Private collection | V 339; R 424; FWN 779 |
| | Fruit bowl, Glass and Apples | 1879-80 | 46 × 55 cm | Museum of Modern Art, New York City | V 341; R 418; FWN 780 |
| | Still Life with Apples in a Bowl | 1879-80 | 43.5 × 54 cm | Ny Carlsberg Glyptotek, Copenhagen | V 342; R 419; FWN 781 |
| | Still Life with Fruit Dish, Apples and Bread | 1879-80 | 55 × 74.5 cm | Am Römerholz, Winterthur | V 344; R 420; FWN 782 |
| | Begonias | 1879-80 | 46 × 54 cm | Private collection | V 198; R 470; FWN 783 |
| | Flowers | 1879-80 | 52.7 × 43 cm | Private collection | R 469; FWN 784 |
| | Five Bathers | 1879–1880 | 34.5 × 38.1 cm | Detroit Institute of Arts | V 389; R 448; FWN 935 |
| | The Côte des Jalais in Pontoise | c. 1879-81 | 60 × 73 cm | Private collection | V 319; R 410; FWN 146 |
| | Landscape in Provence | 1879-82 | 54.7 × 65.5 cm | Pola Museum of Art, Kanagawa | V 403; R 440; FWN 150 |
| | The Road Bridge at L'Estaque | 1879-82 | 55 × 65.5 cm | Ateneum, Helsinki | V 402; R 439; FWN 151 |
| | Rocks at L'Estaque | 1879-82 | 73 × 91 cm | São Paulo Museum of Art | V 404; R 402; FWN 153 |
| | Standing Bather, Seen from the Back | 1879-82 | 33 × 22 cm | Art Institute of Chicago | V 393; R 452; FWN 932 |
| | Standing Bather Seen from Behind | 1879–1882 | 27.5 × 17.2 cm | Princeton University Art Museum | V 394; R 453; FWN 933 |
| | L'Estaque | 1879-83 | 80 × 99.3 cm | Museum of Modern Art, New York City | V 492; R 443; FWN 154 |
| | Bay of L'Estaque | 1879-83 | 59.7 × 73 cm | Philadelphia Museum of Art | V 489; R 444; FWN 155 |
| | Valley of the Oise | c. 1880 | 72 × 91 cm | Private collection | V 311; R 434; FWN 147 |
| | Road leading to the Lake | c. 1880 | 92 × 75 cm | Kröller-Müller Museum, Otterlo | V 327; R 435; FWN 148 |
| | Zola's House at Médan | c. 1880 | 59 × 72 cm | Kelvingrove Art Gallery and Museum, Glasgow | V 325; R 437; FWN 149 |
| | Portrait of Victor Chocquet | c. 1880 | 20 × 15.5 cm | Private collection | R 461; FWN 453 |
| | Portrait of the Artist's Son | c. 1880 | 21.5 × 13.3 cm | Private collection | V 282; R 463; FWM 458 |
| | The Battle of Love | c. 1880 | 38 × 46 cm | National Gallery of Art, Washington D.C. | V 380; R 456; FWN 657 |
| | The Judgement of Paris | c. 1880 | 50 × 60 cm | Unknown | V 537; R 457; FWN 658-TA |
| | Leda and the Swan | c.1880 | 59.7 × 74.9 cm | Barnes Foundation, Philadelphia | V 550; R 447; FWN 660 |
| | Flowers and Fruits | c. 1880 | 35 × 21 cm | Musée de l'Orangerie, Paris | V 359; R 471; FWN 785 |
| | Flowers in a Blue Vase | c. 1880 | 30 × 23 cm | Musée de l'Orangerie, Paris | V 362; R 472; FWN 786 |
| | Flowers | c. 1880 | 40 × 20 cm | Kreeger Museum, Washington D.C. | V 361; R 474; FWN 787 |
| | Flowers in a Blue Vase | c. 1880 | 31.1 × 27 cm | Private collection | R 473; FWN 788 |
| | Still Life with Flowers in an Olive Jar | c. 1880 | 46 × 33.5 cm | Philadelphia Museum of Art | V 218; R 475; FWN 789 |
| | Four Bathers | c. 1880 | 35 × 39.5 cm | Private collection | V 547; R 458; FWN 942 |
| | Bathers | c. 1880 | 19 × 21 cm | Ohara Museum of Art, Kurashiki | V 545; R 459; FWN 943 |
| | Self-Portrait with Olive-Colored Wallpaper | 1880–1881 | 33.6 × 26 cm | National Gallery, London | V 365; R 482; FWN 462 |
| | Vase of Flowers | 1880-81 | 47 × 55.2 cm | Norton Simon Museum, Pasadena | V 358; R 478; FWN 791 |
| | Flowers in a Red Vase | 1880-81 | 46.3 × 55.5 cm | Private collection | V 360; R 476; FWN 792 |
| | Four Apples | 1880-81 | 21 × 33.5 cm | Private collection | V 364; R 481; FWN 793 |
| | Plate with Fruit and Pot of Preserves | 1880-81 | 20.2 × 36 cm | Barnes Foundation, Philadelphia | V 363; R 480; FWN 794 |
| | Fruits, Napkin and Milk Jug | 1880-81 | 60 × 73 cm | Musée de l'Orangerie, Paris | V 356; R 479; FWN 795 |
| | Flowers in an Olive Pot | 1880-81 | 68 × 57 cm | Private collection | V 511; R 477; FWN 790 |
| | The Bath | 1880-81 | 35 × 22 cm | Staatsgalerie Stuttgart | V 395; R 451; FWN 931 |
| | Five Bathers | 1880-81 | 60 × 73 cm | Private collection | V 390; R 449; FWN 936 |
| | Portrait of Victor Chocquet | 1880-85 | 45 × 36.7 cm | Private collection | V 532; R 460; FWN 454 |
| | The Mill on the Couleuvre near Pontoise | 1881 | 72.5 × 90 cm | Alte Nationalgalerie, Berlin | V 324; R 483; FWN 158 |
| | The Hermitage at Pontoise | 1881 | 46.5 × 56 cm | Von der Heydt Museum, Wupperrtal | V 176; R 484; FWN 159 |
| | Auvers-sur-Oise, the Valhermeil Quarter | 1881 | 53 × 85.5 cm | Private collection | V 315; R 489; FWN 164 |
| | The Railroad Bridge and Dam, Pontoise | 1881 | 60 × 73 cm | National Museum of Western Art, Tokyo | V 316; R 500; FWN 173 |
| | House along a Road | c. 1881 | 58 × 71.6 cm | Hermitage Museum, Saint Petersburg | V 330; R 486; FWN 160 |
| | House along a Road | c. 1881 | 53.3 × 44.5 cm | Tel Aviv Museum of Art | V 328; R 487; FWN 161 |
| | The Road at Valhermeil, Auvers-sur-Oise | c. 1881 | 60 × 73 cm | Private collection | V 178; R 488; FWN 162 |
| | Turn in the Road | c. 1881 | 60 × 73 cm | Museum of Fine Arts, Boston | V 329; R 490; FWN 163 |
| | The River | c. 1881 | 56.5 × 65.4 cm | Private collection | V 644; R 498; FWN 166 |
| | Maisons au Chou, à Pontoise | c. 1881 | 80 × 63.5 cm | Private collection | V 308; R 485; FWN 167 |
| | Landscape | c. 1881 | 45.8 × 55.2 cm | Private collection | V 154; R 497; FWN 168 |
| | Landscape | c. 1881 | 50 × 61 cm | National Gallery of Art, Washington D.C. | V 297; R 496; FWN 169 |
| | Fortifications at Glacière | c. 1881 | 54 × 65 | Unknown | V 322; R 494; FWN 171-TA |
| | Hamlet of Pâtis in Pontoise, framed by trees | c. 1881 | 74 × 93 cm | Nationalmuseum, Stockholm | V 317; R 499; FWN 172 |
| | House and Fir Trees | c. 1881 | 47 × 55.2 cm | Kreeger Museum, Washington D.C. | V 334; R 502; FWN 174 |
| | The bend in the road near Valhermeil | 1881-82 | 60 × 72 cm | Private collection | V 313; R 492; FWN 165 |
| | The Uphill Road | 1881-82 | 59 × 71 cm | National Gallery of Victoria, Melbourne | V 333; R 501; FWN 175 |
| | The countryside of Auvers-sur-Oise | 1881-82 | 92.5 × 73.5 cm | Goulandris Museum of Contemporary Art, Athens | V 312; R 505; FWN 176 |
| | The Tree by the Bend | 1881-82 | 60 × 73 cm | Israel Museum, Jerusalem | V 303; R 504; FWN 177 |
| | Portrait of the Artist's Son | 1881-82 | 29 × 32 cm | Private collection | V 1522; R 467; FWN 459 |
| | Self-Portrait after Renoir | 1881-82 | 57 × 47 cm | Hermitage Museum, St. Petersburg | V 372; R 446; FWN 461 |
| | Self-Portrait with White Turban | 1881–1882 | 55.5 × 46 cm | Neue Pinakothek, Munich | V 284; R 510; FWN 464 |
| | Portrait of the Artist's Son | 1881-82 | 34 × 37.5 cm | Musée de l'Orangerie, Paris | V 535; R 465; FWN 465 |
| | Viaduct at L'Estaque | 1882 | 46.5 × 55 cm | Allen Memorial Art Museum, Oberlin | V 401; R 441; FWN 156 |
| | Les Coteaux du Chou, Pontoise | 1882 | 73 × 92 cm | Private collection | V 318; R 493; FWN 179 |
| | A Meadow | 1882 | 60 × 49.5 cm | Private collection | V 442; R 506; FWN 180 |
| | Farm in Normandy | 1882 | 64 × 80 cm | Private collection | V 447; R 509; FWN 181 |
| | Farm in Normandy | 1882 | 50 × 65 cm | Albertina, Vienna | V 445; R 507; FWN 182 |
| | Farm in Normandy | 1882 | 49.5 × 99 cm | Courtauld Gallery, London | V 443; R 508; FWN 183 |
| | L'Estaque, the Village and the Sea | c.1882 | 53.5 × 64.5 cm | Rosengart Collection Museum, Lucerne | V 294; R 491; FWN 157 |
| | Roofs of Paris | c.1882 | 59.4 × 72.4 cm | Private collection | V 175; R 503; FWN 178 |
| | Montagne Sainte-Victoire Seen from Montbriand | c.1882- 1885 | 48 × 59 cm | Private collection | V 453; R 512; FWN 184 |
| | Portrait of the Artist's Son | c.1882 | 28 × 32 cm | Wadsworth Atheneum, Hartford | V 1521; R 468; FWN 460 |
| | Self-Portrait | c.1882 | 46 × 38 cm | Pushkin Museum, Moscow | V 368; R 445; FWN 463 |
| | The Verdon Canal Aqueduct north of Aix | 1882-83 | 57 × 72 cm | Private collection | V 296; R 520; FWN 186 |
| | L'Estaque, View Through the Pines | 1882–1883 | 72.5 × 90 cm | Private Collection | V 409; R 518; FWN 187 |
| | View of L'Estaque | 1882-83 | 59.5 × 73 cm | Private collection | V 407; R 514; FWN 188 |
| | Morning View of L'Estaque Against the Sunlight | 1882-83 | 60 × 92 cm | Israel Museum, Jerusalem | V 410; 516; FWN 189 |
| | Mont Sainte-Victoire and the Viaduct of the Arc River Valley | 1882-85 | 65.4 × 81.6 cm | Metropolitan Museum of Art, New York | V 452; R 511; FWN 185 |
| | House in Provence | c. 1883 | 65 × 81.3 cm | National Gallery of Art, Washington D.C. | V 397; R 438; FWN 152 |
| | View of the Bay of Marseille with the Village of Saint-Henri | c. 1883 | 65 × 81 cm | Philadelphia Museum of Art | V 411; R 515; FWN 190 |
| | Portrait of Madame Cezanne | c. 1883 | 20.2 × 14 cm | Private collection | V 533; R 533; FWN 467 |
| | Portrait of the Artist Looking Over His Shoulder | 1883–1884 | 25 × 25 cm | Goulandris Museum of Contemporary Art, Athens | V 517; R 535; FWN 471 |
| | L'Estaque with Red Roofs | 1883–1885 | 65 × 81 cm | Private collection | V 399; R 517; FWN 191 |
| | Landscape at L'Estaque | 1883-85 | 60.6 × 70.5 cm | Private collection | V 405; R 519; FWN 192 |
| | View of L'Estaque and the If Castle (The Sea in L'Estaque) | 1883–1885 | 71 × 57.7 cm | Private collection | V 406; R 531; FWN 193 |
| | View of the sea at L'Estaque | 1883-85 | 100 × 81 cm | Staatliche Kunsthalle Karlsruhe, Karlsruhe | V 770; R 530; FWN 194 |
| | Plaine in Provence | 1883-85 | 58 × 79 cm | Kunstmuseum Bern | V 302; R 513; FWN 197 |
| | Portrait of Madame Cezanne in a Striped Robe | 1883-85 | 56.5 × 47 cm | Yokohama Museum of Art | V 229; R 536; FWN 466 |
| | Portrait of Madame Cezanne | 1883-85 | 46.4 × 38.4 cm | Philadelphia Museum of Art | V 526; R 532; FWN 468 |
| | Portrait of the Artist's Son | 1883-85 | 19.5 × 11.5 cm | Von der Heydt Museum, Wuppertal | V 536; R 534; FWN 469 |
| | Bathers Outside a Tent | 1883–1885 | 63 × 84 cm | Staatsgalerie Stuttgart | V 543; R 553; FWN 944 |
| | Farmhouse and Chestnut Trees at Jas de Bouffan | c. 1884 | 92 × 73.7 cm | Norton Simon Museum, Pasadena | R 595; FWN 200 |
| | The Road to La Roche-Guyon | 1885 | 62.2 × 75.5 cm | Smith College Museum of Art, Northampton | V 441; R 539; FWN 204 |
| | The Gulf of Marseilles Seen from L'Estaque | c. 1885 | 73 × 100 cm | Metropolitan Museum of Art, New York | V 429; R 625; FWN 195 |
| | The Bay of Marseilles, view from L'Estaque | 1885 | 80.2 × 100.6 cm | Art Institute of Chicago | V 493; R 626; FWN 196 |
| | Autumn Landscape | c. 1885 | 62 × 80.5 | Barnes Foundation, Philadelphia | V 301; R 526; FWN 198 |
| | Meadow and Farm of Jas de Bouffan | c. 1885 | 66 × 82.5 cm | National Gallery of Canada, Ottawa | V 466; R 523; FWN 199 |
| | Horse-chestnut trees at Jas de Bouffan | c. 1885 | 65 × 81 | Kunstmuseum Winterthur | V 478; R 521; FWN 201 |
| | Chestnut Trees and Farm at Jas de Bouffan | c.1885 | 65.5 × 81.3 cm | Private collection | V 467; R 538; FWN 202 |
| | The Countryside beyond the wall of Jas de Bouffan | c. 1885 | 65 × 81 cm | Private collection | V 469; R 528; FWN 203 |
| | The Rotating Road at La Roche-Guyon | c. 1885 | 64.1 × 85.7 cm | Private collection | R 540; FWN 205 |
| | Hilly landscape near Médan | c. 1885 | 64 × 77 cm | Private collection | V 298; R 527; FWN 206 |
| | Médan, Chateau and Village | c. 1885 | 81 × 65 cm | Private collection | V 439; R 542; FWN 207 |
| | Landscape in Northern France | c. 1885 | 45 × 53.5 cm | Kagoshima City Museum of Art | V 487; R 541; FWN 208 |
| | Interior of a Forest | c. 1885 | 46.5 × 56.3 cm | Art Gallery of Ontario, Toronto | V 155; R 543; FWN 209 |
| | Tree and Houses, Provence | c. 1885 | 60 × 81 cm | National Gallery, Oslo | V 481; R 550; FWN 220 |
| | Large Pine and Red Earth | c. 1885 | 81 × 100 cm | Private collection | V 459; R 537; FWN 221 |
| | Gardanne | c. 1885 | 65 × 100.3 cm | Barnes Foundation, Philadelphia | V 430; R 569; FWN 224 |
| | Provençal Manor | c.1885 | 33 × 48.3 cm | Princeton University Art Museum | R 602; FWN 232 |
| | Château Noir between the Trees | c. 1885 | 73.5 × 92.5 cm | Am Römerholz, Winterthur | V 667; R 522; FWN 237 |
| | Portrait of the Artists Son | c. 1885 | 25 × 20 cm | Private collection | V 534; R 579; FWN 470 |
| | Portrait of Jules Peyron | c. 1885 | 46.4 × 38.1 cm | Fogg Museum, Cambridge | V 531; R R 578; FWN 474 |
| | Self-Portrait | c. 1885 | 34 × 25 cm | Private collection | V 518; R 586; FWN 477 |
| | Self-Portrait after a Photograph | c. 1885 | 55 × 46.3 cm | Carnegie Museum of Art, Pittsburgh | V 1519; R 587; FWN 480 |
| | The Gardiner | c. 1885 | 65 × 54 cm | Barnes Foundation, Philadelphia | V 546; R 525; FWN 673 |
| | Still Life with Pears | c. 1885 | 38 × 46 cm | Wallraf–Richartz Museum, Cologne | V 744; R 556; FWN 796 |
| | Two fruits | c. 1885 | 19. 23.2 cm | Private collection | R 557; FWN 797 |
| | Four Apples and a Knife | c. 1885 | 22 × 26 cm | Private collection | V 509; R 562; FWN 798 |
| | Pomegranate and Pear and a Plate | c. 1885 | 27 × 36 cm | Private collection | R 558; FWN 799 |
| | Apples, Orange and Lemon | c. 1885 | 23 × 33.7 cm | Kunstmuseum Bern | V 204; R 564; FWN 800-TA |
| | Still Life with Six Pears | c. 1885 | 38 × 46 cm | Unknown | R 559; FWN 803-TA |
| | Apples on a Sheet | c. 1885 | 38.5 × 46.5 cm | Private collection | V 510; R 560; FWN 804 |
| | Still Life with Skull | c. 1885 | 33.2 × 45 cm | White House collection, Washington D.C. | V 751; R 565; FWN 805-TA |
| | Bather | c. 1885 | 127 × 96.8 cm | Museum of Modern Art, New York | V 548; R 555; FWN 915 |
| | Five Bathers | c. 1885 | 65 × 65 cm | Kunstmuseum Basel | V 542; R 554; FWN 945 |
| | The Pool at the Jas de Bouffan | 1885-86 | 64.8 × 80.9 cm | Metropolitan Museum of Art, New York | V 648; R 566; FWN 215 |
| | Chestnut Trees at Jas de Bouffan | 1885-86 | 73.3 × 92.5 cm | Minneapolis Institute of Art | V 476; R 551; FWN 216 |
| | The Bare Trees at Jas de Bouffan | 1885-86 | 60 × 73 cm | National Museum of Western Art, Tokyo | V 414; R 552; FWN 217 |
| | Trees and Houses | 1885-86 | 54 × 73 cm | Musée de l'Orangerie, Paris | V 480; R 549; FWN 218 |
| | Trees and Houses Near the Jas de Bouffan | 1885-86 | 68 × 92 cm | Metropolitan Museum of Art, New York | V 479; R 548; FWN 219 |
| | The Village of Gardanne | 1885-86 | 92.1 × 73.2 cm | Brooklyn Museum, New York | V 421; R 571; FWN 223 |
| | A Lady in a Fur Wrap after El Greco | 1885-86 | 53 × 49 cm | Private collection | V 376; R 568; FWN 472 |
| | Portrait of Madame Cézanne | 1885-86 | 46 × 38 | Private collection | V 520; R 580; FWN 475 |
| | Portrait of Madame Cézanne | 1885-86 | 46 × 38 cm | Philadelphia Museum of Art | V 521; R 576; FWN 476 |
| | Self-Portrait in a Bowler Hat | 1885-86 | 44.5 × 35.5 cm | Ny Carlsberg Glyptotek, Copenhagen | V 514; R 584; FWN 478 |
| | Self-Portrait in a Bowler Hat | 1885-86 | 42 × 34 cm | Private collection | V 515; R 585; FWN 479 |
| | Portrait of Madame Cézanne | 1885–1886 | 55.6 × 45.7 cm | Solomon R. Guggenheim Museum, New York | V 525; R 582; FWN 481 |
| | Portrait of Madame Cézanne | 1885–1886 | 46 × 38 cm | Musée d'Orsay, Paris | V 524; R 583; FWN 482 |
| | Portrait of Madame Cézanne with Loosened Hair | 1883–1886 | 61.9 × 51.1 cm | Philadelphia Museum of Art | V 527; R 685; FWN 500 |
| | Undergrowth | 1885-87 | 54 × 65 cm | Private collection | V 1525; R 544; FWN 210 |
| | Landscape with Poplars | 1885–1887 | 71 × 58 cm | National Gallery, London | V 633; R 545; FWN 211 |
| | High Trees In Jas de Bouffan | 1885–1887 | 73 × 59 cm | Private collection | V 474; R 546; FWN 212 |
| | Tall Trees at the Jas de Bouffan | 1885–1887 | 64.7 × 79.5 cm | Courtauld Institute of Art, London | V 475; R 547; FWN 213 |
| | The Neighborhood of Jas de Bouffan | 1885–1887 | 65 × 81 cm | Solomon R. Guggenheim Museum, New York | V 473; R 524; FWN 214 |
| | Landscape in Provence | 1885-87 | 63 c 94 cm | Private collection | V 486; R 609; FWN 229 |
| | Still Life with Peaches and Pears | 1885-87 | 37.3 × 45.2 cm | Private collection | V 504; R 563; FWN 801 |
| | Still Life with Cherries and Peaches | 1885-87 | 50.4 × 61 cm | Los Angeles County Museum of Art | V 498; R 561; FWN 806 |
| | Still Life With Quince, Apples, and Pears | 1885-87 | 28.5 × 30.2 cm | White House collection, Washington D.C. | R 637; FWN 809 |
| | Landscape in Provence | 1885-88 | 65 × 81 cm | Wallraf–Richartz Museum, Cologne | V 448; R 715; FWN 233 |
| | Still Life with Flowers in a Vase | 1885-88 | 46.5 × 55.5 cm | Private collection | R 672; FWN 822 |
| | Bathsheba | 1885-90 | 29 × 25 cm | Musée d'Orsay, Paris | V 253; R 591; FWN 662 |
| | Bathsheba | 1885-90 | 21.5 × 20 cm | Private collection | V 255; R 592; FWN 663 |
| | Bathsheba | 1885-90 | 31.5 × 23.5 cm | Private collection | V 252; R 593; FWN 664 |
| | The Toilette | 1885-90 | 33.7 × 25.7 cm | Barnes Foundation, Philadelphia | V 254; R 594; FWN 665 |
| | The Peasant Family, after Adriaen van Ostade | 1885-90 | 46 × 38 cm | Private collection | R 589; FWN 667 |
| | Riverbank | c. 1885-90 | 73 × 92 cm | National Gallery of Art, Washington D.C. | V 634; R 722; FWN 283 |
| | Gardanne | c. 1886 | 80 × 64.2 cm | Metropolitan Museum of Art, New York | V 432; R 570; FWN 222 |
| | Trees in the Park, Jas de Bouffan | c. 1886 | 72 × 91 cm | Pushkin Museum, Moscow | V 462; R 567; FWN 225 |
| | Abandoned House near Aix-en-Provence | c. 1886 | 65 × 82.5 cm | Dallas Museum of Art | V 451; R 597; FWN 231 |
| | Mont Sainte-Victoire with Large Pine | 1886–1887 | 59.7 × 72.5 cm | The Phillips Collection, Washington, D.C. | V 455; R 598; FWN 234 |
| | Portrait of the Artist's son Paul Cézanne | 1886-87 | 64.5 × 54 cm | National Gallery of Art, Washington, D.C. | V 519; R 649; FWN 486 |
| | Portrait of Madame Cézanne | 1886-87 | 100.6 × 81.3 cm | Detroit Institute of Arts | V 528; R 607; FWN 487 |
| | Portrait of Madame Cézanne | 1886-87 | 46.5 × 38.5 cm | Musée d'Orsay, Paris | V 530; R 581; FWN 488 |
| | Portrait of Madame Cézanne | 1886-87 | 74.1 × 61 cm | Museum of Fine Arts, Houston | V 529; R 650; FWN 489 |
| | Self-Portrait with Palette | 1886-87 | 92 × 73 | Foundation E.G. Bührle, Zurich | V 516; R 670; FWN 499 |
| | The Aisle of Chestnut Trees at the Jas de Bouffan | c. 1886-87 | 81 × 64.5 cm | Barnes Foundation, Philadelphia | V 649; R 617; FWN 243 |
| | Montagne Sainte-Victoire, from near Gardanne | 1886-88 | 67.5 × 91.5 cm | National Gallery of Art, Washington D.C. | V 437; R 574; FWN 228 |
| | Mont Sainte-Victoire and Hamlet Near Gardanne | 1886-90 | 62.5 × 91 cm | White House collection, Washington D.C. | V 435; R 572; FWN 226 |
| | House in Provence | 1886-1890 | 65.5 × 81.3 cm | Indianapolis Museum of Art | V 433; R 573; FWN 227 |
| | Environs of Gardanne | 1886-90 | 58.5 × 71.8 cm | Private collection | V 436; R 575; FWN 230 |
| | Mont Sainte-Victoire with Large Pine | c. 1887 | 66 × 90 cm | Courtauld Institute of Art, London | V 454; R 599; FWN 235 |
| | Jas de Bouffan | c. 1887 | 60 × 73 cm | National Gallery in Prague | V 460; R 600; FWN 238 |
| | Chestnut trees and Jas de Bouffan farm | c. 1887 | 65 × 81 cm | Rhode Island School of Design Museum, Providence | V 463; R 611; FWN 239 |
| | The Farm at the Jas de Bouffan | c. 1887 | 60 × 73.5 cm | Barnes Foundation, Philadelphia | V 461; R 596; FWN 240 |
| | Nude Woman | c. 1887 | 44 × 62 cm | Von der Heydt Museum, Wuppertal | V 551; R 590; FWN 661 |
| | Six Bathers | c. 1887 | 33 × 44 cm | Private collection | V 538; R 588; FWN 957 |
| | Le Pilon du Roi | 1887-88 | 82.3 × 101 cm | Am Römerholz, Winterthur | V 658; R 605; FWN 242 |
| | Still Life with Dresser | 1887-88 | 73 × 92.2 cm | Neue Pinakothek, Munich | V 496; R 635; FWN 807 |
| | Still Life with Dresser | 1887-88 | 75.5 × 81 cm | Fogg Art Museum, Cambridge | V 487; R 634; FWN 808 |
| | The Large Pine | 1887-89 | 85.5 × 92.5 cm | São Paulo Museum of Art | V 669; R 601; FWN 236 |
| | The House with the Red Roof | 1887-90 | 73 × 92 cm | Private collection | V 468; R 603; FWN 241 |
| | Avenue at Chantilly | 1888 | 81.3 × 64.8 cm | Toledo Museum of Art | V 627; R 616; FWN 244 |
| | Avenue at Chantilly | 1888 | 81 × 65 cm | National Gallery, London | V 626; R 615; FWN 245 |
| | Avenue at Chantilly | 1888 | 82 × 66 cm | Private collection | V 628; R 614; FWN 246 |
| | Mardi Gras | 1888 | 102 × 81 cm | Pushkin Museum, Moscow | V 552; R 618; FWN 668 |
| | Banks of the Marne | c. 1888 | 63 × 79 cm | Art Gallery of New South Wales, Sydney | V 632; R 628; FWN 251 |
| | Provençal Landscape | c. 1888 | 80 × 61.5 cm | National Museum Cardiff | V 446; R 613; FWN 256 |
| | Mont Sainte-Victoire | c. 1888 | 54 × 65 cm | Stedelijk Museum Amsterdam | V 456; R 608; FWN 257 |
| | Girl with Birdcage | c. 1888 | 45.4 × 37.8 cm | Barnes Foundation, Philadelphia | V 98; R 641; FWN 672 |
| | The Bent Tree | 1888-90 | 46 × 55 cm | Hiroshima Museum of Art | V 420; R 610; FWN 247 |
| | Landscape | 1888-90 | 64.5 × 81 cm | Ohara Museum of Art | V 482; R 604; FWN 252 |
| | Forest Interior of Fontainebleau | 1888–1890 | 63 × 79 cm | Private collection | V 332; R 627; FWN 253-TA |
| | Château near Paris | 1889-90 | 73 × 92 cm | Kunstmuseum Bern | V 636; R 630; FWN 254 |
| | Mount Sainte-Victoire | 1888-1890 | 65 × 81 cm | Private collection | V 662; R 631; FWN 258 |
| | View of the Domaine Saint-Joseph | 1888-90 | 65 × 81 cm | Metropolitan Museum of Art, New York | V 660; R 612; FWN 260 |
| | The Winding Road | 1888-90 | 54.5 × 65 cm | Private collection | R 633; FWN 261-TA |
| | Portrait of Madame Cézanne | 1888-90 | 92.7 × 73 cm | Barnes Foundation, Philadelphia | V 522; R 683; FWN 485 |
| | Madame Cézanne in a Yellow Armchair | 1888-90 | 81 × 65 cm | Beyeler Foundation, Riehen | V 571; R 651; FWN 490 |
| | Portrait of Madame Cézanne | 1888-90 | 89 × 70 cm | São Paulo Museum of Art | V 573; R 652; FWN 491 |
| | Madame Cézanne in a Yellow Chair | 1888-90 | 80.9 × 64.9 cm | Art Institute of Chicago | V 572; R 653; FWN 492 |
| | Madame Cézanne (Hortense Fiquet, 1850–1922) in a Red Dress | 1888–1890 | 116.5 × 89.5 cm | The Metropolitan Museum of Art, New York | V 570; R 655; FWN 493 |
| | Boy in a Red Waistcoat | 1888–1890 | 66 × 55 cm | Barnes Foundation, Philadelphia | V 683; R 656; FWN 494 |
| | Boy in a Red Vest | 1888–1890 | 81.2 × 65 cm | Museum of Modern Art, New York | V 680; R 657; FWN 495 |
| | The Boy in the Red Vest | 1888–1890 | 79.5 × 64 cm | Foundation E.G. Bührle, Zurich | V 681; R 658; FWN 496 |
| | Boy in a Red Waistcoat | 1888–1890 | 92 × 73 cm | National Gallery of Art, Washington, D.C. | V 682; R 659; FWN 497 |
| | Preparation of a Banquet | 1888-90 | 45 × 53.5 cm | National Museum of Art, Osaka | V 586; R 640; FWN 666 |
| | Harlequin | 1888-90 | 62.3 × 47.2 cm | Pola Museum of Art, Hakone | V 555; R 619; FWN 669 |
| | Harlequin | 1888-1890 | 92 × 65cm | Private collection | V 553; R 621; FWN 670 |
| | Harlequin | 1889-1890 | 100 × 65 cm | National Gallery of Art, Washington, D.C. | V 554; R 620; FWN 671 |
| | Still Life with Apples and Pear | 1888-90 | 27 × 35 cm | Private collection | V 354; R 638; FWN 810 |
| | Still Life with Apples and Pears | 1888-90 | 36 × 45 cm | Private collection | V 507; R 646; FWN 811 |
| | Pot of Primroses and Fruits | 1888-90 | 45 × 54 cm | Courtauld Gallery, London | V 623; R 639; FWN 812 |
| | Kitchen Table (Still Life With Basket) | 1888–1890 | 65 × 81.5 cm | Musée d'Orsay, Paris | V 594; R 636; FWN 813 |
| | Still Life | 1888-90 | 27.7 × 40.9 cm | Pola Museum of Art, Kanagawa | V 200; R 642; FWN 814 |
| | Water Jug and Fruits | 1888-90 | 48.6 × 60 cm | Private collection | V 615; R 645; FWN 815 |
| | The Curtain | 1888-90 | 92 × 73 cm | Abegg-Stiftung, Riggisberg | V 747; R 654; FWN 817 |
| | Women Bathing | 1888-90 | 72 × 92 cm | Ny Carlsberg Glyptotek, Copenhgaen | V 726; R 667; FWN 956 |
| | Banks of the Marne | 1888-94 | 73 × 91 cm | White House Collection, Washington D.C. | R 622; FWN 248 |
| | Banks of the Marne | 1888-94 | 65 × 81 cm | Hermitage Museum, St Petersburg | V 630; R 623; FWN 249 |
| | The Banks of the Marne | 1888-94 | 50 × 61 cm | Unknown | V 629; R 624; FWN 250-TA |
| | Portrait of Victor Chocquet | 1888-94 | 81 × 65 cm | Private collection | V 562; R 671; FWN 498 |
| | House and Trees | 1889-90 | 65.4 × 81.3 cm | Barnes Foundation, Philadelphia | V 646; R 629; FWN 255 |
| | Hunting Cabin in Provence | 1889-90 | 58.3 × 81 cm | Barnes Foundation, Philadelphia | V 671; R 632; FWN 259 |
| | The Pigeon Tower at Bellevue | 1889-90 | 64 × 80 cm | Cleveland Museum of Art | V 650; R 692; FWN 270 |
| | Still Life with Apples | 1889-90 | 38 × 45.7 cm | Private collection | V 501; R 673; FWN 819 |
| | The Blue Vase | 1889-1890 | 62 × 51 cm | Musée d’Orsay, Paris | V 512; R 675; FWN 823 |
| | Vase of Flowers and Apples | 1889-90 | 55 × 47 cm | Private collection | V 513; R 660; FWN 828 |

== Paintings 1890–1906 ==
| Image | Title | Year | Dimensions | Location | Cat. No. |
|---|---|---|---|---|---|
| | Alley at Jas de Bouffan | c. 1890 | 73 × 92 cm | Musée d'Art et d'Histoire, Geneva | V 471; R 687; FWN 262 |
| | A Copse | c. 1890 | 61.5 × 52 cm | Honolulu Museum of Art | V 444; R 696; FWN 263 |
| | Trees and Road | c. 1890 | 71.7 × 59 cm | Barnes Foundation, Philadelphia | V 672; R 697; FWN 264 |
| | The Montagne Sainte-Victoire and Viaduct on the Valcros Side | c.1890 | 91 × 72 cm | Pushkin Museum, Moscow | V 477; R 695; FWN 265 |
| | House in Bellevue and Dovecote | c. 1890 | 54 × 74 cm | Unknown | V 652; R 689; FWN 267-TA |
| | House in Belleville | c. 1890 | 60.5 × 74 cm | Musée d'Art et d'Histoire, Geneva | V 655; R 691; FWN 269 |
| | Dovecote in Bellevue | c. 1890 | 53 × 80 cm | Kunstmuseum Basel | V 653; R 693; FWN 271 |
| | Dovecote in Bellevue | c. 1890 | 58 × 78 cm | Private collection | V 654; R 694; FWN 272 |
| | Montagne Saint-Victoire | c. 1890 | 65 × 95.2 cm | Musée d'Orsay, Paris | V 488; R 698; FWN 273 |
| | House in Provence | c. 1890 | 65.5 × 81.2 cm | Barnes Foundation, Philadelphia | V 643; R 686; FWN 275 |
| | Portrait of Madame Cézanne | c. 1890 | 81 × 65 cm | Musée de l'Orangerie, Paris | V 523; R 684; FWN 483 |
| | Boy Resting | c. 1890 | 54 × 65.5 cm | Hammer Museum, Los Angeles | V 391; R 682; FWN 674 |
| | Fountain with Peacock | c. 1890 | 30 × 124 cm | Unknown | V 584; R 643; FWN 675 |
| | Both and Bathers | c. 1890 | 30 × 124 cm | Musée de l'Orangerie, Paris | V 583; R 644; FWN 676 |
| | Still Life with Fruits | c. 1890 | 28 × 40.5 cm | Private collection | V 206; R 677; FWN 802 |
| | Fruits and Leaves | c. 1890 | 29 × 29 cm | Private collection | V 613; R 647; FWN 816-TA |
| | Still Life | c. 1890 | 38.4 × 45.4 cm | Private collection | V 603; R 648; FWN 818 |
| | Still Life with Apples | c. 1890 | 35 × 46 cm | Hermitage Museum, St. Petersburg | V 1518; R 674; FWN 820 |
| | Still Life with Apples and Tea Cup | c. 1890 | 46.6 × 55.8 cm | Private collection | V 621; R 661; FWN 821 |
| | Still Life with Apples and a Pot of Primroses | c. 1890 | 73 × 92.4 cm | Metropolitan Museum of Art, New York | V 599; R 680; FWN 824 |
| | Still Life with Flowers and Fruit | c. 1890 | 65 × 81 cm | Alte Nationalgalerie, Berlin | V 610; R 676; FWN 825 |
| | Vase of Tulips | c. 1890 | 59.6 × 42.3 cm | Art Institute of Chicago | V 617; R 719; FWN 826 |
| | Bottle and Fruits | c. 1890 | 48.2 × 72.2 cm | Barnes Foundation, Philadelphia | V 606; R 678; FWN 829 |
| | Still Life with Bottles and Peaches | c. 1890 | 49 × 51 cm | Stedelijk Museum Amsterdam | V 604; R 679; FWN 830 |
| | Still Life with Pears and Brandy | c. 1890 | 54.2 × 65.7 cm | Private collection | V 606; R 681; FWN 831 |
| | Still Life | c. 1890 | 46 × 55 cm | Am Römerholz, Winterthur | V 750; R 662; FWN 832 |
| | Still Life with Milk Jug and Fruit | c. 1890 | 59.5 × 72.5 cm | National Museum of Norway, Oslo | V 593; R 663; FWN 833 |
| | Still Life with Peaches and Pears | c. 1890 | 61 × 90 cm | Pushkin Museum, Moscow | V 619; R 664; FWN 834 |
| | Bathers | c. 1890 | 22.6 × 35.4 cm | Art Institute of Chicago | V 589; R 750; FWN 946 |
| | Bathers | c. 1890 | 60 × 81 cm | Musée d'Orsay | V 580; R 665; FWN 947 |
| | Bathers | c. 1890 | 39 × 53 cm | Private collection | V 541; R 747; FWN 948 |
| | Bathers | c. 1890 | 29.1 × 45.4 cm | Musée d'Orsay | V 540; R 668; FWN 958 |
| | Bathers | 1890-91 | 54 × 65 cm | Hermitage Museum, St. Petersburg | V 582; R 748; FWN 949 |
| | The Forest | 1890-92 | 73 × 92 cm | White House Collection, Washington D.C. | V 645; R 699; FWN 266 |
| | House at Bellevue with Dovecote | 1890-92 | 66 × 81 cm | Museum Folkwang, Essen | V 651; R 690; FWN 268 |
| | The Bellevue Plain - The Red Earth | 1890-92 | 81.3 × 100.6 cm | Barnes Foundation, Philadelphia | V 450; R 716; FWN 276 |
| | Hillside in Provence | 1890-92 | 65 × 81 cm | National Gallery, London | V 491; R 718; FWN 277 |
| | Portrait of a Peasant | 1890-92 | 55 × 46 cm | Private collection | V 567; R 704; FWN 501 |
| | Man with a Pipe | 1890-92 | 43.2 × 34.3 cm | Nelson-Atkins Museum of Art, Kansas City | V 563; R 705; FWN 678 |
| | Study for the Card Players | 1890-92 | 32 × 35 cm | Worcester Art Museum | V 568; R 708; FWN 679 |
| | The Card Players | 1890-92 | 65.4 × 81.9 cm | Metropolitan Museum of Art, New York | V 559; R 707; FWN 680 |
| | The Card Players | 1890–1892 | 135.3 × 181.9 cm | Barnes Foundation, Philadelphia | V 560; R 706; FWN 681 |
| | The Card Player | 1890-92 | 50 × 46 cm | Musée d'Orsay, Paris | R 709; FWN 682 |
| | Tulips in a Vase | 1890-92 | 72.5 × 42 | Norton Simon Museum, Pasadena | V 618; R 721; FWN 827 |
| | Bathers | 1890-92 | 52.7 × 64.2 cm | Saint Louis Art Museum | V 581; R 666; FWN 950 |
| | Fruits on a Table | 1890-93 | 38.5 × 44.5 cm | Barnes Foundation, Philadelphia | V 608; R 730; FWN 835 |
| | Straw-Trimmed Vase, Sugar Bowl and Apples | 1890-93 | 35 × 45 cm | Musée de l'Orangerie, Paris | V 616; R 733; FWN 837 |
| | Still Life with Skull | 1890-93 | 54.3 × 65.4 cm | Barnes Foundation, Philadelphia | V 758; R 734; FWN 838 |
| | Ginger Pot with Pomegranates and Pears | 1890-93 | 46.4 × 55.6 cm | The Phillips Collection, Washington D.C. | V 733; R 735; FWN 839 |
| | Fruit with Ginger Pot | 1890-93 | 33.3 × 46.7 cm | Private collection | V 595; R 736; FWN 840 |
| | Pitcher and Plate of Pears | 1890-93 | 49 × 59 cm | Private collection | V 609; R 737; FWN 845 |
| | Jas de Bouffan | 1890-94 | 74.6 × 54.6 cm | Private collection | V 470; R 688; FWN 279 |
| | Hagar and Ishmael after Delacroix | 1890-94 | 50 × 56.5 cm | Private collection | V 708; R 745; FWN 677 |
| | Apotheosis of Delacroix | 1890-94 | 27 × 35 cm | Musée d'Orsay, Paris | V 245; R 746; FWN 687 |
| | Four Peaches on a Plate | 1890-94 | 25.5 × 38.5 cm | Barnes Foundation, Philadelphia | V 614; R 732; FWN 836 |
| | Large Pine and Red Earth | 1890-94 | 72 × 91 cm | Hermitage Museum, Saint Petersburg | V 458; R 761; FWN 274 |
| | Boy Sitting | 1890-95 | 37.5 × 49.2 cm | Private collection | R 779; FWN 510 |
| | Bathers | 1890-95 | 28.5 × 51 cm | Private collection | V 388; R 752; FWN 951 |
| | Man with a Pipe | c. 1891 | 92 × 73 cm | Kunsthalle Mannheim | V 684; R 756; FWN 505 |
| | Man with a Pipe | c. 1891 | 91 × 72 cm | Hermitage Museum, Saint Petersburg | V 686; R 757; FWN 506 |
| | Man with a Pipe | c. 1891 | 91 × 72 cm | Pushkin Museum, Moscow | V 688; R 790; FWN 507 |
| | Woman in a Green Hat (Madame Cézanne) | 1891-92 | 100.3 × 81.3 cm | Barnes Foundation, Philadelphia | V 704; R 700; FWN 484 |
| | Madame Cézanne in the Conservatory | 1891-92 | 92.1 × 73 cm | Metropolitan Museum of Art, New York | V 569; R 703; FWN 509 |
| | Still Life with Apples and Pears | 1891-92 | 44.8 × 58.7 cm | Metropolitan Museum of Art, New York | V 502; R 701; FWN 841 |
| | Terracotta Pots and Flowers | 1891-92 | 92.4 × 73.3 cm | Barnes Foundation, Philadelphia | V 602; R 702; FWN 858 |
| | Man with a Pipe | 1891-96 | 73 × 60 cm | Courtauld Institute of Art, London | V 564; R 712; FWN 504 |
| | The Card Players | 1891–96 | 60 × 73 cm | Courtauld Institute of Art, London | V 557; R 713; FWN 686 |
| | Forest Path | c. 1892 | 66 × 81 cm | Private collection | V 647; R 759; FWN 289 |
| | Statue | c. 1892 | 35 × 16.5 cm | Private collection | V 709; R 785; FWN 690 |
| | Plate of Peaches | c. 1892 | 31 × 40 cm | Am Römerholz, Winterthur | V 607; R 731; FWN 849 |
| | Bathers | c. 1892 | 22 × 33 cm | Musée d'Orsay, Paris | V 587; R 749; FWN 952 |
| | Waters and Foliage | 1892-93 | 75 × 63 cm | Private collection | V 638; R 728; FWN 287 |
| | Reflections in the Water | 1892-94 | 65 × 92 cm | The Museum of Art, Ehime, Matsuyama | V 639; R 726; FWN 284 |
| | Millstone in the Park of the Château Noir | 1892-94 | 73 × 92.4 cm | Philadelphia Museum of Art | V 768; R 763; FWN 291 |
| | Millstone and Cistern under Trees | 1892-94 | 65.1 × 81 cm | Barnes Foundation, Philadelphia | V 485; R 764; FWN 292 |
| | The House with the Cracked Walls | 1892–1894 | 80 × 60.4 cm | Metropolitan Museum of Art, New York | V 657; R 760; FWN 294 |
| | Still Life | 1892-94 | 73.3 × 92.4 cm | Barnes Foundation, Philadelphia | V 592; R 845; FWN 842 |
| | Still Life | 1892-94 | 65.1 × 81.3 cm | Barnes Foundation, Philadelphia | V 745; R 844; FWN 843 |
| | Still Life with a Curtain | 1892-94 | 55 × 74.5 cm | Hermitage Museum, Saint Petersburg | V 731; R 846; FWN 844 |
| | Group of Bathers | 1892-94 | 30.5 × 40.7 cm | Barnes Foundation, Philadelphia | V 590; R 753; FWN 953 |
| | Bathers | 1892-94 | 26 × 40 cm | Pushkin Museum, Moscow | V 588; R 754; FWN 954 |
| | Country House by a River | c. 1892-94 | 81 × 65 cm | Israel Museum, Private collection | V 645; R 727; FWN 285 |
| | Fields at Bellevue | 1892-95 | 36.2 × 50.2 cm | The Phillips Collection, Washington D.C. | V 449; R 717; FWN 278 |
| | Landscape Near Aix, The Plain of the Arc River | 1892-95 | 82.7 × 66 cm | Carnegie Museum of Art, Pittsburgh | V 472; R 758; FWN 293 |
| | Mont Sainte-Victoire seen from Bellevue | 1892-95 | 73 × 92 cm | Barnes Foundation, Philadelphia | V 457; R 767; FWN 296 |
| | Mont Sainte-Victoire seen from Gardanne | 1892-95 | 73 × 92 cm | Yokohama Museum of Art | V 434; R 768; FWN 297 |
| | Grand Bouquet of Flowers | 1892-95 | 81 × 100 cm | National Museum of Western Art, Tokyo | V 620; R 720; FWN 859 |
| | Man with a Pipe | 1892-96 | 26 × 20.5 cm | National Gallery of Art, Washington D.C. | V 566; R 711; FWN 683 |
| | The Card Players | 1892–1896 | 97 × 130 cm | Private collection | V 556; R 710; FWN 685 |
| | Rocks in the Forest | c.1893 | 51 × 61 cm | Kunsthaus Zürich | V 674; R 776; FWN 290 |
| | Rocks at Fontainebleau | c. 1893 | 73.3 × 92.4 cm | Metropolitan Museum of Art, New York | V 673; R 775; FWN 322 |
| | Still Life with Water Jug | c. 1893 | 53 × 71 cm | Tate Britain, London | V 749; R 738; FWN 846 |
| | The Basket of Apples | c. 1893 | 65 × 80 cm | Art Institute of Chicago | V 600; R 800; FWN 860 |
| | Forest | 1893-94 | 116 × 81 cm | Los Angeles County Museum of Art | V 419; R 815; FWN 303 |
| | Pitcher and Fruits | 1893-94 | 43.2 × 62.8 cm | Private collection | V 500; R 744; FWN 847 |
| | Apples and Cloth | 1893-94 | 26 × 36.3 cm | Barnes Foundation, Philadelphia | V 611; R 740; FWN 848 |
| | Fruit and a Jug on a Table | 1893-94 | 33 × 41 cm | Museum of Fine Arts, Boston | V 612; R 741; FWN 850 |
| | Jug and Fruit on a Table | 1893-94 | 41 × 72 cm | Private collection | V 499; R 742; FWN 851 |
| | Sugar Bowl, Pears and Tablecloth | 1893-94 | 50.9 × 62 cm | Pola Museum of Art, Hakone | V 624; R 771; FWN 852 |
| | Stoneware Pitcher | 1893-94 | 38 × 46 cm | Beyeler Foundation, Riehen | V 622; R 743; FWN 853 |
| | Curtain, Jug and Dish of Fruit | 1893–94 | 59 × 72.4 cm | Private collection | V 601; R 739; FWN 854 |
| | Still Life with Pot and Apples | 1893-94 | 65.4 × 81.6 cm | J. Paul Getty Museum, Los Angeles | V 598; R 770; FWN 855 |
| | Still Life wth Ginger Pot and Aubergines | 1893-94 | 73 × 92 cm | Metropolitan Museum of Art, New York | V 597; R 769; FWN 856 |
| | Still Life with Peppermint Bottle | 1893-95 | 65,7 × 82 cm | National Gallery of Art, Washington D.C. | V 625; R 772; FWN 857 |
| | The Card Players | 1893–1896 | 47 × 56.5 cm | Musée d'Orsay, Paris | V 558; R 714; FWN 684 |
| | Winter Landscape, Giverny | 1894 | 65.1 × 81 cm | Philadelphia Museum of Art | V 440; R 777; FWN 299 |
| | Giverny | 1894 | 65 × 81 cm | Private collection | R 778; FWN 300 |
| | Self-Portrait in a Felt Hat | 1894 | 60 × 49 cm | Artizon Museum Tokyo | V 579; R 774; FWN 511 |
| | House on a River | c. 1894 | 51.5 × 61 cm | Art Institute of Chicago | R 723; FWN 280 |
| | At the Water's Edge | c. 1894 | 73 × 92 cm | National Gallery of Art, Washington D.C. | V 637; R 724; FWN 281 |
| | The Machefer Island Bridge in Saint-Maur-des-Fossés | c. 1894 | 64 × 79 cm | Pushkin Museum, Moscow | V 641; R 725; FWN 282 |
| | Aqueduct and Lock | c. 1894 | 73 × 92 cm | Private collection | V 640; R 765; FWN 286 |
| | Bridge at Créteil | c. 1894 | 71 × 90 cm | Pushkin Museum, Moscow | V 631; R 729; FWN 288 |
| | Winter Landscape | c. 1894 | 61 × 73 cm | Private collection | R 529; FWN 298 |
| | Landscape near Aix with the Tour de César | c. 1894 | 73 × 92 cm | Museum Boijmans Van Beuningen, Rotterdam | V 300; R 793; FWN 301 |
| | Young Man Reading | c. 1894 | 82 × 66 cm | Private collection | V 678; R 788; FWN 512 |
| | Bibémus | 1894-95 | 71 × 90 cm | Solomon R. Guggenheim Museum, New York | V 781; R 794; FWN 304 |
| | Bibémus | 1894-95 | 46.3 × 55 cm | Barnes Foundation, Philadelphia | V 782; R 795; FWN 305 |
| | Plaster Cherub | 1894-95 | 57 × 25 cm | Private collection | V 711; R 783; FWN 688 |
| | Plaster Cherub | 1894-95 | 44.5 × 30.8 cm | Harvard Art Museums, Cambridge | V 1609; R 784; FWN 689 |
| | Still Life with Statuette | 1894-95 | 63 × 81 cm | Nationalmuseum, Stockholm | V 707; R 782; FWN 691 |
| | Mont Sainte-Victoire | c. 1895 | 81 × 100.5 cm | Hermitage Museum, St. Petersburg | V 664; R 762; FWN 295 |
| | The Glade | c. 1895 | 100 × 81 cm | Private collection | V 670; R 814; FWN 302 |
| | The Quarry at Bibémus | c.1895 | 65 × 81 cm | Museum Folkwang, Essen | V 767; R 797; FWN 306 |
| | In the Bibémus Quarry | c. 1895 | 79 × 63.5 cm | Private collection | V 772; R 798; FWN 307 |
| | The Red Rock | c. 1895 | 91 × 66 cm | Musée de l'Orangerie, Paris | V 776; R 799; FWN 308 |
| | Maison Maria with a View of Château Noir | c. 1895 | 65 × 81 cm | Kimbell Art Museum, Fort Worth | V 761; R 792; FWN 309 |
| | Bibémus Quarry | c. 1895 | 92 × 73 cm | Barnes Foundation, Philadelphia | V 773; R 836; FWN 316 |
| | Peasant Standing with Arms Crossed | c. 1895 | 82.5 × 59 cm | Barnes Foundation, Philadelphia | V 561; R 787; FWN 508 |
| | Study for Woman with a Coffeepot | c. 1895 | 36 × 38.5 cm | Private collection | R 780; FWN 513 |
| | Woman with a Coffeepot | c. 1895 | 130 × 97 cm | Musée d'Orsay, Paris | V 574; R 781; FWN 514 |
| | Self-Portrait | c. 1895 | 55 × 46 cm | Private collection | V 578; R 876; FWN 517 |
| | Young Girl with a Doll | c. 1895 | 92 × 73 cm | Private collection | V 675; R 806; FWN 518 |
| | Still Life with Cherub | c. 1895 | 70 × 57 cm | Courtauld Institute of Art, London | V 706; R 786; FWN 692 |
| | Ginger pot | c. 1895 | 73.5 × 60.5 cm | Barnes Foundation, Philadelphia | V 737; R 773; FWN 861 |
| | Still Life with Apples and Melons | c. 1895 | 46 × 61 cm | Private collection | V 596; R 802; FWN 862 |
| | A Table Corner | c. 1895 | 47 × 56.5 cm | Barnes Foundation, Philadelphia | V 746; R 801; FWN 863 |
| | Group of Bathers | c. 1895 | 21.5 × 30.8 cm | Philadelphia Museum of Art | V 591; R 755; FWN 955 |
| | Group of Bathers | c. 1895 | 47 × 77 cm | Ordrupgaard, Copenhagen | R 751; FWN 960 |
| | An Old Woman with a Rosary | 1895–96 | 80.6 × 65.5 cm | National Gallery, London | V 702; R 808; FWN 515 |
| | Portrait of Gustave Geffroy | 1895-96 | 116 × 89 cm | Musée d'Orsay, Paris | V 692; R 791; FWN 516 |
| | Two Apples on a Table | 1895-98 | 24.1 × 33.2 cm | Speed Art Museum, Louisville | V 503; R 840; FWN 864 |
| | The Large Pear | 1895-98 | 46 × 55 cm | Barnes Foundation, Philadelphia | V 740; R 842; FWN 865 |
| | Still Life with Apples | 1895-98 | 68.5 × 92.7 cm | Museum of Modern Art, New York | V 637; R 804; FWN 869 |
| | Brook in the Undergrowth | 1895-1900 | 60 × 81 cm | Cleveland Museum of Art | V 783; R 766; FWN 310 |
| | Bathers | 1895-1905 | 136.7 × 196.1 cm | National Gallery, London | V 721; R 855; FWN 979 |
| | The Large Bathers | 1895-1906 | 132.4 × 219.1 cm | Barnes Foundation, Philadelphia | V 720; R 856; FWN 980 |
| | Annecy Lake | 1896 | 65 × 81 cm | Courtauld Institute of Art, London | V 762; R 805; FWN 311 |
| | Boy with a Straw Hat | 1896 | 69 × 58 | Los Angeles County Museum of Art | V 700; R 813; FWN 520 |
| | Portrait of Joachim Gasquet | 1896 | 65 × 54 cm | National Gallery Prague | V 694; R 809; FWN 521 |
| | Portrait of Henri Gasquet | 1896 | 56 × 47 cm | McNay Art Museum, San Antonio | V 695; R 810; FWN 522 |
| | Child with a Straw Hat | 1896 | 81 × 65 cm | Menard Art Museum, Komaki | V 698; R 895; FWN 537 |
| | Portrait of a Girl | c. 1896 | 55 × 46 cm | National Museum of Art of Romania, Bucharest | V 676; R 807; FWN 519 |
| | Road at Mont Sainte-Victoire | 1896-98 | 78 × 99 cm | Hermitage Museum, Saint Petersburg | V 663; R 899; FWN 349 |
| | Young Man and Skull | 1896-98 | 130 × 97.5 cm | Barnes Foundation, Philadelphia | V 679; R 825; FWN 693 |
| | Still Life with Onions | 1896-98 | 66 × 82 cm | Musée d'Orsay, Paris | V 730; R 803; FWN 866 |
| | Vase of Flowers | 1896-98 | 70.5 × 58.4 cm | Barnes Foundation, Philadelphia | V 755; R 892; FWN 870 |
| | Mont Sainte-Victoire | 1897 | 73 × 91.5 cm | Museum of Fine Arts Bern | V 763; R 796; FWN 314 |
| | Mountains Mont Sainte-Victoire Seen from the Bibémus Quarry | c. 1897 | 65.1 × 81.3 cm | Baltimore Museum of Art | V 766; R 837; FWN 315 |
| | Pines and Rocks | c. 1897 | 81.3 × 65.4 cm | Museum of Modern Art, New York | V 774; R 906; FWN 323 |
| | A Seated Peasant | c. 1897 | 55 × 46 cm | Hiroshima Museum of Art | V 565; R 817; FWN 523 |
| | Man in a Blue Smock | c. 1897 | 81.5 × 64.8 cm | Kimbell Art Museum, Fort Worth | V 687; R 826; FWN 524 |
| | Undergrowth | 1897-98 | 73 × 57 cm | Arkansas Museum of Fine Arts, Little Rock | V 1526; R 819; FWN 312 |
| | Undergrowth | 1897-98 | 54.5 × 46 cm | Private collection | V 422; R 820; FWN 313 |
| | Vase of Flowers | 1897-98 | 40.5 × 29.5 cm | Private collection | V 752; R 816; FWN 867 |
| | Farm in Montgeroult | 1898 | 64 × 52 cm | Arkansas Museum of Fine Arts, Little Rock | V 656; R 833; FWN 320 |
| | Turning Road at Montgeroult | 1898 | 81.2 × 66 cm | Museum of Modern Art, New York | V 668; R 828; FWN 321 |
| | The Allée at Marines | 1898 | 65.4 × 98.4 cm | Barnes Foundation, Philadelphia | V 642; R 829; FWN 325 |
| | Bibémus Quarry | c. 1898 | 65 × 54 cm | Private collection | V 777; R 838; FWN 317 |
| | Roofs | c. 1898 | 65.7 × 81.6 cm | Dallas Museum of Art | R 830; FWN 326 |
| | Church at Montigny-sur-Loing | c. 1898 | 93 × 74 cm | Barnes Foundation, Philadelphia | V 1531; R 832; FWN 327 |
| | Village in the Provence | c. 1898 | 65 × 81 cm | Kunsthalle Bremen | V 438; R 831; FWN 328 |
| | Bouquet of Peonies in a Green Jar | c. 1898 | 57.5 × 65.5 cm | Private collection | V 748; R 875; FWN 868 |
| | The Three Skulls | c. 1898 | 34.9 × 61 cm | Detroit Institute of Arts | V 1567; R 821; FWN 873 |
| | Forest Interior | 1898–1899 | 61 × 81 cm | Fine Arts Museums of San Francisco | V 784; R 905; FWN 324 |
| | Seated Peasant | 1898-99 | 54.6 × 45.1 cm | Metropolitan Museum of Art, New York | V 691; R 827; FWN 526 |
| | Standing Nude | 1898-99 | 92.7 × 71 cm | Private collection | V 710; R 897; FWN 694 |
| | Bibémus Quarry | 1898-1900 | 65 × 54 cm | Nelson-Atkins Museum of Art, Kansas City | V 778; R 839; FWN 318 |
| | In the park of Château Noir | 1898-1900 | 92 × 73 cm | Musée de l'Orangerie, Paris | V 779; R 878; FWN 319 |
| | The Drinker | 1898-1900 | 47.5 × 39 cm | Barnes Foundation, Philadelphia | V 690; R 818; FWN 525 |
| | Self-Portrait with Beret | 1898-1900 | 63.3 × 50.8 cm | Museum of Fine Arts, Boston | V 693; R 834; FWN 529 |
| | Seated Man | 1898-1900 | 102.5 × 75.5 cm | National Gallery, Oslo | V 697; R 789; FWN 530 |
| | Pyramid of Skulls | 1898-1900 | 39 × 46.5 cm | Private collection | V 753; R 822; FWN 874 |
| | Bathers | 1898-1900 | 27 × 46.5 cm | Baltimore Museum of Art | V 724; R 861; FWN 962 |
| | Portrait of Ambroise Vollard | 1899 | 100 × 82 cm | Musée du Petit Palais, Paris | V 696; R 811; FWN 531 |
| | Portrait of Alfred Hauge | 1899 | 71.8 × 60.3 cm | Norton Museum of Art, West Palm Beach | V 677; R 835; FWN 532 |
| | Man with Crossed Arms | c. 1899 | 90.2 × 72.7 cm | Private collection | V 685; R 850; FWN 527 |
| | Man with Crossed Arms | c. 1899 | 92 × 72.7 cm | Solomon R. Guggenheim Museum, New York | V 689; R 851; FWN 528 |
| | Portrait of a Woman | c. 1899 | 93.3 × 73.3 cm | Barnes Foundation, Philadelphia | V 575; R 853; FWN 533 |
| | Apples and Oranges | c. 1899 | 74 × 93 cm | Musée d'Orsay, Paris | V 732; R 847; FWN 871 |
| | Bathers | c. 1899 | 22 × 33 cm | Musée d'Orsay, Paris | V 585; R 862; FWN 963 |
| | Bathers | 1899-1904 | 51.3 × 61.7 cm | Art Institute of Chicago | V 722; R 859; FWN 976 |
| | Trees and Rocks near the Château Noir | c. 1900 | 61 × 50 cm | Dixon Gallery and Gardens, Memphis | V 792; R 888; FWN 334 |
| | Cistern in the Park of Château Noir | c. 1900 | 74.3 × 61 cm | Princeton University Art Museum | V 780; R 907; FWN 336 |
| | Young Italian Girl Resting On Her Elbow | c. 1900 | 92 × 73 cm | J. Paul Getty Museum, Los Angeles | V 701; R 812; FWN 534 |
| | Seated Peasant | c. 1900 | 73.3 × 60.3 cm | Musée d'Orsay, Paris | V 713; R 852; FWN 535 |
| | Portrait of a Woman | c. 1900 | 65 × 54 cm | Private collection | V 576; R 854; FWN 536 |
| | The Toilette | c. 1900 | 36 × 27.5 cm | Frederick R. Weisman Art Foundation, Los Angeles | R 872; FWN 695 |
| | Still Life with Faience Jug and Fruit | c. 1900 | 73.7 × 101 cm | Am Römerholz, Winterthur | V 742; R 848; FWN 877 |
| | Still Life with Milk Jug and Fruit | c. 1900 | 45.8 × 54.9 cm | National Gallery of Art, Washington, D.C. | V 735; R 849; FWN 878 |
| | Still Life with Peaches, Carafe and Figure | c. 1900 | 60 × 73 cm | Museum Langmatt, Baden | V 739; R 843; FWN 879 |
| | Bathers | c. 1900 | 27 × 22 cm | Private collection | R 863; FWN 961 |
| | Bathers | c. 1900 | 30 × 44 cm | Private collection | V 727; R 865; FWN 964 |
| | Bathers | c. 1900 | 35 × 22 cm | Private collection | R 870; FWN 967 |
| | Study of Bathers | c. 1900 | 22.8 × 16.8 cm | Private collection | R 871; FWN 971 |
| | Seven Bathers | c. 1900 | 37 × 45 cm | Beyeler Foundation, Riehen | V 387; R 860; FWN 973 |
| | Forest Scene | 1900-02 | 81 × 64.5 cm | Beyeler Foundation, Riehen | V 1527; R 884; FWN 339 |
| | Montagne Sainte-Victoire | 1900-02 | 54.6 × 64.8 cm | Scottish National Gallery, Edinburgh | V 661; R 901; FWN 348 |
| | Sketch of Bathers | 1900-02 | 20 × 33 cm | Private collection | V 729; R 866; FWN 965 |
| | Vase of Flowers | 1900-03 | 101.5 × 82.2 cm | National Gallery of Art, Washington D.C. | V 757; R 893; FWN 881 |
| | Trees at Le Tholonet | 1900-1904 | 81.3 × 65 cm | Menil Collection, Houston | R 879; FWN 329 |
| | Morning in Provence | 1900-04 | 79.4 × 62.3 cm | Buffalo AKG Art Museum | V 791; R 885; FWN 330 |
| | Trees | 1900-04 | 44 × 37 cm | Private collection | R 886; FWN 331 |
| | The Forest | 1900-04 | 62.2 × 51.5 cm | Fitzwilliam Museum, Cambridge | V 421; R 883; FWN 332 |
| | Rocks and Branches at Bibémus | 1900-04 | 61 × 50.2 cm | Petit Palais, Paris | V 785; R 881; FWN 333 |
| | The Grounds of the Château Noir | 1900–1904 | 90.7 × 71.5 cm | National Gallery, London | V 787; R 880; FWN 335 |
| | Route to Le Tholonet | 1900-04 | 101.1 × 81.3 cm | Princeton University Art Museum | R 942; FWN 347 |
| | Château Noir | 1900–1904 | 74 × 96.5 cm | National Gallery of Art, Washington, D.C. | V 796; R 937; FWN 359 |
| | Château Noir | 1900-04 | 73 × 92 cm | Musée Picasso | V 795; R 941; FWN 361 |
| | Skull | 1900-04 | 61 × 50 cm | Staatsgalerie Stuttgart | R 823; FWN 872 |
| | Large Vase in the Garden | 1900-04 | 65 × 54 cm | Private collection | V 756; R 891; FWN 880 |
| | Five Bathers | 1900-04 | 42.2 × 55 cm | Musée d'Orsay, Paris | R 864; FWN 966 |
| | Bathers | 1900-04 | 28 × 36 cm | Private collection | V 723; R 858; FWN 977 |
| | Sketch of Bathers | 1900-06 | 65 × 81 cm | Magnani-Rocca Foundation, Mamiano | V 1523; R 869; FWN 970 |
| | Bathers | 1900-06 | 23.5 × 35.5 cm | Private collection | FWN 974 |
| | Study of Bathers | 1900-06 | 21.2 × 32.5 cm | Rosengart Collection Museum, Lucerne | R 874; FWN 975 |
| | Forest | 1902–1904 | 81.3 × 66 cm | National Gallery of Canada, Ottawa | V 1530; R 887; FWN 341 |
| | The Big Trees | 1902-04 | 81 × 65 cm | Scottish National Gallery, Edinburgh | V 760; R 904; FWN 343 |
| | Mount Sainte-Victoire | 1902-04 | 69.8 × 89.5 cm | Philadelphia Museum of Art | V 798; R 912; FWN 351 |
| | Little Girl with a Doll | 1902–1904 | 73 × 60 cm | Private collection | V 699; R 896; FWN 538 |
| | Seated Woman in Blue | 1902-06 | 66 × 49.8 cm | The Phillips Collection, Washington D.C. | V 703; R 945; FWN 540 |
| | Bouquet of Flowers, after Delacroix | 1902-04 | 77 × 66 cm | Pushkin Museum, Moscow | V 754; R 894; FWN 882 |
| | Bathers | 1902-04 | 24 × 27.5 cm | Barnes Foundation, Philadelphia | V 728; R 873; FWN 972 |
| | The Winding Road in the Undergrowth | 1902-06 | 81.3 × 64.8 cm | Private collection | V 789; R 889; FWN 340 |
| | The Bend in the Road | 1902-06 | 81.3 × 64.8 cm | National Gallery of Art, Washington D.C. | V 790; R 930; FWN 346 |
| | Mount Sainte-Victoire | 1902-06 | 65 × 81 cm | Philadelphia Museum of Art | V 799; R 911; FWN 352 |
| | Mount Sainte-Victoire | 1902-06 | 65 × 81.3 cm | Nelson-Atkins Museum of Art, Kansas City | V 800; R 913; FWN 353 |
| | Mount Sainte-Victoire | 1902-06 | 65 × 81 cm | Private collection | V 802; R 914; FWN 354 |
| | Mount Sainte-Victoire | 1902-06 | 56.6 × 96.8 cm | Metropolitan Museum of Art, New York | V 804; R 915; FWN 356 |
| | Mount Sainte-Victoire | 1902-06 | 63.5 × 83 cm | Kunsthaus Zürich | V 801; R 916; FWN 364 |
| | Portrait of a Woman | 1902-06 | 64 × 53 cm | Private collection | V 1611; R 898; FWN 539 |
| | The Gardener Vallier | 1902-06 | 107.4 × 74.5 cm | National Gallery of Art, Washington, D.C. | R 949; FWN 543 |
| | Portrait of Vallier | 1902-06 | 107 × 72.4 cm | Private collection | V 716; R 948; FWN 544 |
| | Portrait of the Gardener Vallier | 1902-06 | 100.3 × 81.3 cm | Private collection | V 717; R 951; FWN 545 |
| | Still Life with Ginger Jar Sugar Bowl and Oranges | 1902-06 | 60.6 × 73.3 cm | Museum of Modern Art, New York | V 738; R 933; FWN 883 |
| | Still Life with Teapot | 1902–1906 | 61.6 × 74.3 cm | National Museum Cardiff | V 734; R 934; FWN 884 |
| | Bathers | 1902-06 | 29.2 × 23.5 cm | Private collection | R 867; FWN 968 |
| | Sketch of Bathers | 1902-06 | 32 × 40 cm | Private collection | R 868; FWN 969 |
| | Bathers | 1902-06 | 73.5 × 92.5 cm | Private collection | V 725; R 877; FWN 978 |
| | Château Noir | 1903-04 | 73.6 × 93.2 cm | Museum of Modern Art, New York | V 794; R 940; FWN 360 |
| | Three Skulls on an Oriental Rug | 1904 | 54.5 × 65 cm | Kunstmuseum Solothurn | V 759; R 824; FWN 875 |
| | Trees and Rocks in the Ground of the Château Noir | c. 1904 | 92 × 73 cm | Museum Langmatt, Baden | V 788; R 908; FWN 337 |
| | Boulders near the Caves above Château Noir | c. 1904 | 65 × 54 cm | Musée d'Orsay, Paris | V 786; R 909; FWN 338 |
| | The Winding Road | c. 1904 | 64 × 48.2 cm | Fogg Museum, Cambridge | R 890; FWN 344 |
| | Mont Sainte-Victoire above the Tholonet road (with Umbrella Pine) | c. 1904 | 73.2 × 92.1 cm | Cleveland Museum of Art | V 666; R 900; FWN 350 |
| | Mont Sainte-Victoire seen from the Grove at the Château Noir | c. 1904 | 65 × 80.3 cm | Private collection | V 665; R 902; FWN 357 |
| | Château Noir | c. 1904 | 70 × 80 cm | Private collection | V 797; R 919; FWN 358 |
| | Mont Sainte-Victoire | c. 1904 | 54 × 64 cm | Private collection | R 918; FWN 366 |
| | On the Banks of a River | c. 1904 | 60.9 × 73.6 cm | Rhode Island School of Design Museum, Providence | V 769; R 920; FWN 369 |
| | Banks of a River | c. 1904 | 65 × 81 cm | Kunstmuseum Basel | V 771; R 925; FWN 370 |
| | Landscape by a River | c. 1904 | 65 × 81 cm | Private collection | V 1533; R 922; FWN 371 |
| | Landscape | c. 1904 | 70 × 90 cm | Private collection | R 923; FWN 373 |
| | Turning Road | c. 1904 | 73 × 92 cm | Courtauld Gallery, London | V 1532; R 921; FWN 374 |
| | Lady in Blue | c. 1904 | 88.5 × 72 cm | Hermitage Museum, St. Petersburg | V 705; R 944; FWN 541 |
| | Rocks and Trees | c. 1904-05 | 81.6 × 66 cm | Barnes Foundation, Philadelphia | V 775; R 903; FWN 342 |
| | Blue Landscape | 1904-06 | 102 × 83 cm | Hermitage Museum, St. Petersburg | V 793; R 882; FWN 345 |
| | Mont Sainte-Victoire | 1904–1906 | 83.8 × 65 cm | Princeton University Art Museum | R 910; FWN 355 |
| | Mount Sainte-Victoire and Château Noir | 1904–1906 | 65.6 × 81 cm | Artizon Museum, Tokyo | V 765; R 939; FWN 362 |
| | Mont Sainte-Victoire | 1904-06 | 55 × 46 cm | Detroit Institute of Arts | V 764; R 938; FWN 363 |
| | Mont Sainte-Victoire | 1904-06 | 54 × 73 cm | Private collection | R 917; FWN 365 |
| | Mont Sainte-Victoire seen from Les Lauves | 1904-06 | 60 × 72 cm | Kunstmuseum Basel | V 1529; R 931; FWN 367 |
| | Mont Sainte-Victoire seen from Les Lauves | 1904-06 | 60 × 73 cm | Pushkin Museum, Moscow | V 803; R 932; FWN 368 |
| | House among Trees | 1904-06 | 46 × 55 cm | Private collection | R 924; FWN 372 |
| | Houses on a Hill | 1904-06 | 60.3 × 79.5 cm | McNay Art Museum, San Antonio | V 1528; R 927; FWN 375 |
| | Houses on a Hill, Provence | 1904-06 | 66 × 81 cm | White House Collection, Washington D.C. | R 929; FWN 376 |
| | The Mont de Cengle | 1904-06 | 73 × 91 cm | Foundation E. G. Bührle, Zurich | V 483; R 928; FWN 377 |
| | Bend of the Road at the Top of the Chemin des Lauves | 1904-06 | 65 × 81 cm | Beyeler Foundation, Riehen | R 946; FWN 378 |
| | Portrait of a Peasant | 1904-06 | 90.8 × 75.6 cm | National Gallery of Canada, Ottawa | V 712; R 943; FWN 542 |
| | Still Life with Fruit | 1904-06 | 73 × 92 cm | Private collection | V 741; R 935; FWN 885 |
| | Still Life with Apples and Peaches | c. 1905 | 81 × 100.5 cm | National Gallery of Art, Washington D.C. | V 936; FWN 886 |
| | Seated Man | 1905–1906 | 64.8 × 54.6 cm | Thyssen-Bornemisza Museum, Madrid | V 714; R 952; FWN 546 |
| | The Gardener Vallier | 1905-06 | 65.5 × 55 cm | Tate Britain, London | V 715; R 950; FWN 547 |
| | The Garden at Les Lauves | 1906 | 65.5 × 81.3 cm | The Phillips Collection, Washington D.C. | V 1610; R 926; FWN 379 |
| | Jourdan's Cabin | 1906 | 65 × 81 cm | Galleria Nazionale d'Arte Moderna, Rome | V 805; R 947; FWN 380 |
| | The Gardener Vallier | 1906 | 65 × 65 cm | Foundation E. G. Bührle, Zurich | V 1524; R 953; FWN 548 |
| | Portrait of Vallier | 1906 | 65 × 54 cm | Private collection | V 718; R 954; FWN 549 |
| | The Bathers | 1906 | 210.5 × 250.8 cm | Philadelphia Museum of Art | V 719; R 857; FWN 981 |
