= The Bunch of Flowers (Cézanne) =

1902–1904 painting by Paul Cézanne

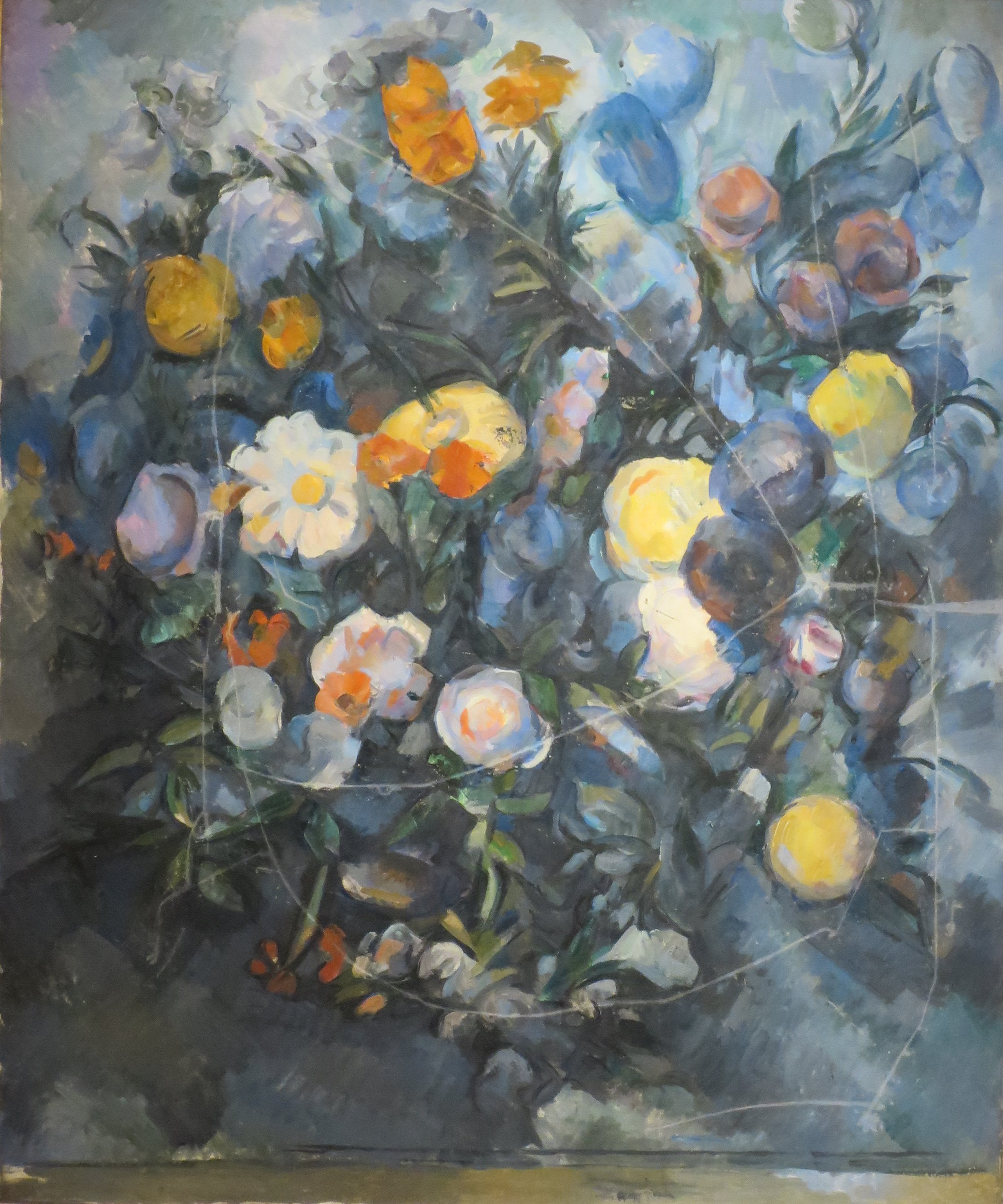
- Artist: Paul Cézanne
- Year: 1902-04
- Medium: oil on canvas
- Dimensions: 77 cm × 64 cm (30 in × 25 in)
- Location: Pushkin Museum, Moscow

The Bunch of Flowers, Vase of Flowers or Flowers is an oil on canvas painting by Paul Cézanne, from 1902–1904. It is held in the Pushkin Museum, in Moscow. It was one of the few times where he portrayed flowers late in his career.

This is one of the few cases where Cézanne chose a floral subject late in his career. Unlike the Impressionists, he did not like to paint flowers; as he confessed to Joachim Gasquet: 'Flowers, I have given them up. They fade straight away.'

== See also ==
- List of paintings by Paul Cézanne
