= Saric =

Saric may refer to:

== Places ==
- Sáric Municipality, Mexico
- Sáric, a town in the municipality

== People with the surname ==
- Šarić, a surname
- Alexander Hoehn-Saric, American attorney
- Ivan Saric (disambiguation)
- Jim Saric, American professional angler
- Lazar Saric, television writer, songwriter, producer, and director
- Mimi Saric (born 1983), Australian footballer
- Nikola Sarić (disambiguation)

== See also ==
- Sarych, a headland on the shore of the Black Sea
