= The Emigrants (Daumier) =

Painting by Honoré Daumier

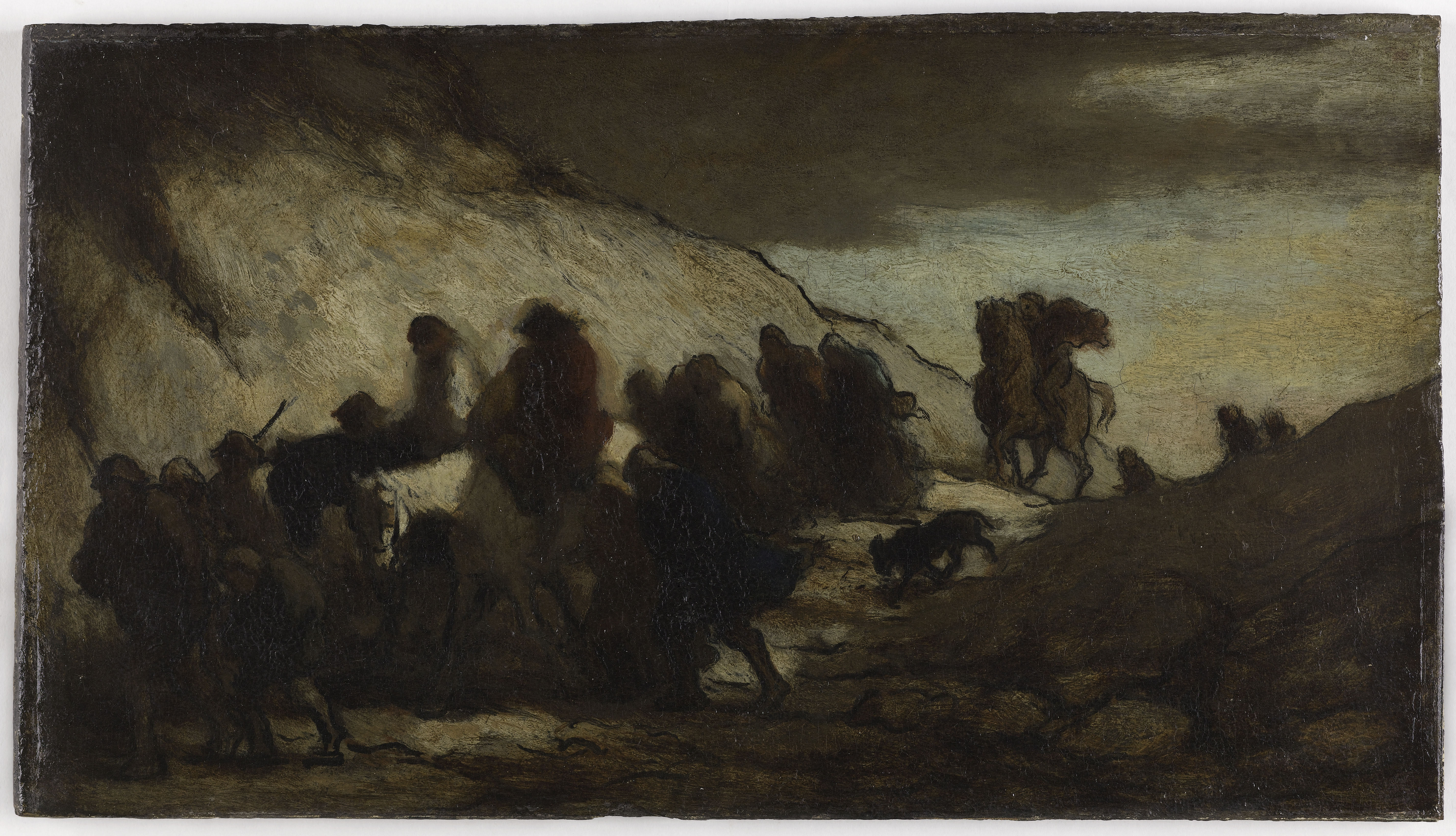
- Artist: Honoré Daumier
- Year: c. 1852–1855
- Medium: oil on wood
- Dimensions: 16.2 cm × 28.7 cm (6.4 in × 11.3 in)
- Location: Petit Palais, Paris

The Emigrants is an oil-on-wood painting by the French realist painter Honoré Daumier. It was created c. 1852–1855 and is of small dimensions: 16.2 cm by 28.7 cm. It is held in the Petit Palais, in Paris. This painting is also known as The Fugitives.

== History ==
After the workers' revolution of June 1848, the government of Louis Philippe reacted with strong repression, issuing death sentences, thousands of imprisonments and deportations to Algeria. Such events inspired Daumier on this painting, as well as a series of oil paintings, lithographs, and several reliefs titled The Emigrants, The Fugitives, and The Detainees.

== Description ==
The painting depicts a group of political fugitives crossing a mountainous landscape, on feet and on horseback. A landscape of dunes is traversed by a column of curved, schematically, hardly recognizable, drawn figures. Contours are defined by thick black lines. The chiaroscuro intensifies the drama of the scene. Daumier manages to convey desperation and anguish through this simple diagonal composition of yellow and brown tones.

== Gallery ==
The Fugitives, c. 1868, Minneapolis Institute of Arts

The Fugitives, 15.5 x 31.1 cm, Burrell Collection
