= Seric =

Seric is a South Slavic surname. Notable people with the surname include:

- Anthony Šerić (born 1979), Australia-born Croatian soccer player
- Andrea Šerić (born 1985), Croatian handball player

== See also ==
- Šarić
