= The Four Seasons, Winter (Cézanne) =

Painting by French artist Paul Cézanne

The Four Seasons: Winter
- Les Quatre Saisons: L’Automne (French)
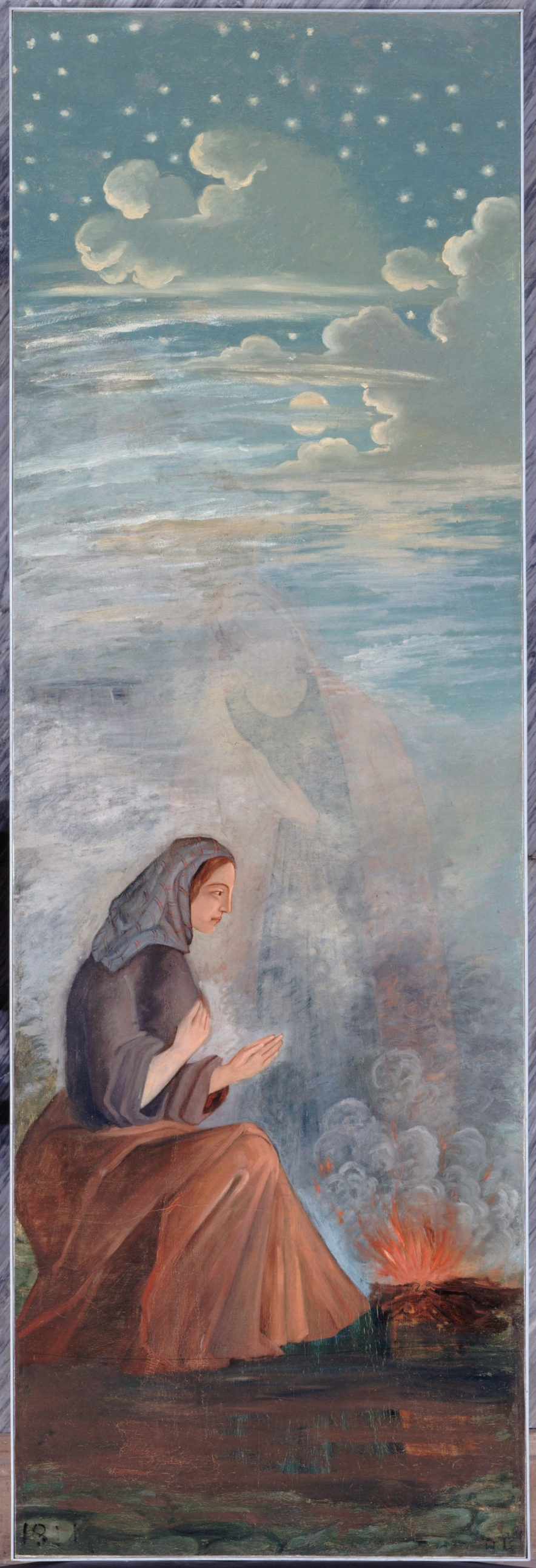
- Artist: Paul Cézanne
- Year: 1860-1861
- Medium: Oil on canvas
- Dimensions: 314 cm × 104 cm (124 in × 41 in)
- Location: Petit Palais, Paris

The Four Seasons: Winter (French: Les Quatre Saisons: L’Hiver) is a painting by French artist Paul Cézanne, created around 1860. It is one of four decorative panels representing Spring, Summer, Autumn, and Winter, painted for the grand salon of the Cézanne family estate, Jas de Bouffan, near Aix-en-Provence. The work is now held in the collection of the Petit Palais, Musée des Beaux-Arts de la Ville de Paris.

== See also ==
- List of paintings by Paul Cézanne
