= Nikola Sarić =

Nikola Sarić may refer to:

- Nikola Sarić (footballer) (born 1991), Danish footballer
- Nikola Sarić (singer) (born 1989), Serbian singer, musician and television personality
- Nikola Sarić (artist) (born 1985), German artist
