= Nikola Sarić (artist) =

Serbian-German painter

Nikola Sarić (born 6 June 1985 in Bajina Bašta) is a German graded artist of Serbian descent focussing on painting and sculpting.

== Life ==
Sarić grew up in Bajina Bašta, Serbia and went to Belgrade in 2000 to study at the TehnoArt School, changed in 2005 to study at the University of Belgrade at the faculty of restoration and conservation, before, in 2006 starting to study at the Academy of the Serbian Orthodox Church for Art and Conservation, where he graduated in 2014. Since 2011 he lives in Hannover, Germany.

== Important works (selection) ==
- Les Martyrs de Libye (Paris, Petit Palais), 2018, 100 × 70 cm, water colours on paper.
- Akathistos to St. Demetrius. 2009, 12 paintings, each 130 × 160 cm, acrylic on canvas.
- Parables of Christ, 2014, cycle of 20 paintings, each 30 × 30 cm, water colours on paper, mounted on wood.
- Holy Martyrs of Libya. 2015 (Eichstätt, Collegium Orientale), 100 × 70 cm, water colours on paper.
- St Chrysogonus, St Katharina, St Konrad. (Hannover, Gartenkirche St. Marien), 2015, 120 × 90 cm, egg tempera and gold leave on wood

== Exhibitions (selection) ==
Solo exhibitions are marked S, exhibitions with catalogues are marked C.

2009

- Свет који се не да замислити, Galerie Otklon, Belgrade (S)

2012

- Separation, konnektor – Forum für Künste, Hannover (S)
- 3rd Yokogawa Charity Art Festival, Hiroshima

2014

- Demetrius – Begegnung mit dem Heiligen, Gartenkirche St. Marien, Hannover (S) (C)
- Laokoon, konnektor – Forum für Künste, Hannover (S)

2015

- 18. ZINNOBER Kunstvolkslauf, Hannover
- Wie durch einen Spiegel – Biblische Ikonographie heute, Religionspädagogisches Institut, Loccum (S)
- 87. Herbstausstellung, Kunstverein, Hannover (C)
- Coptic Orthodox Monastery Brenkhausen, Höxter (S)
- Савремени иконопис у Србији (Contemporary Serbian Icon Painting), Cultural Centre of Novi Sad

2016

- Ikonen und Chimera, Kunstsalon Villa Artista, Hannover (S)
- The Icon in the Context of the 21st Century, Museum of Herzegowina, Trebinje
- Satt mich sehen an deinem Bilde, Mariensee Abbey, Neustadt am Rübenberge (S) (C)
- Wildheit/Zähmung, Schloss Landestrost, Neustadt am Rübenberge
- Παραβολές και Μάρτυρες, Mount Athos Center, Thessaloniki (S)

2017

- Zyklus des Lebens, Fonis Gallery, Düsseldorf (S)
- Zeugen, Church of St. Augustine of Canterbury, Wiesbaden (S)
- Und das Wort ward Bild, Gartenkirche St. Marien, Hannover (S)
- Apărători ai ortodoxiei și Sfinți Martiri din vremea comunismului, Centrul Cultural Ion Manu, Otopeni/Bucharest
- Das fliegende Jackett, Fonis Gallery, Düsseldorf

2018

- 88. Herbstausstellung, Kunstverein, Hannover (C)
- Du spirituel dans la peinture…, Galerie Tokonoma, Paris (S)

2019

- Quantum Music: Decoding Reality, Sprengel Museum Hannover
- Nikola Sarić: Malerei, Great St. Martin Church, Köln (S)
- Der dritte Raum, Sigwardskirche Idensen, Wunstorf (S)
- Nikola Sarić: Malerei, Eisfabrik, Hannover (S)

2020

- Nikola Sarić: Reflexionen, Eichstätt Cathedral Treasury and Diocesan Museum, Eichstätt (S)
- Nikola Sarić: An Artistic and Spiritual Journey, Christopher Boïcos, Paris (S)

2021

- YES? YES!. Zukunftswerkstatt Ihme-Zentrum (S) (C)
- 89. Herbstausstellung, Kunstverein Hannover (C)

2022

- Nikola Sarić: Images of Revelation, Old School of Loggos, Paxos (Greece) (S)

2023

- Nikola Sarić: PowerLESS, Himmelsfahrtskirche, München (S)
- Nikola Sarić: Kreis - unvollendet, Hildesheim Cathedral Museum (S) (C)
- Nikola Sarić: Εικόνες Αποκαλύψεως/Images of Revelation, Old Fortress of Corfu and Antivouniotissa Museum, Corfu (S)
- 90. Herbstausstellung, Kunstverein Hannover (C)

2024

- In Between | Dazwischen, Schloss Landestrost, Neustadt a. Rbge.

2025

- Blicke nach innen: NICÆA, Museum Schloss Bruck, Lienz (C)
- Nikola Sarić: Seen from above, Gallery Genesis, Athens
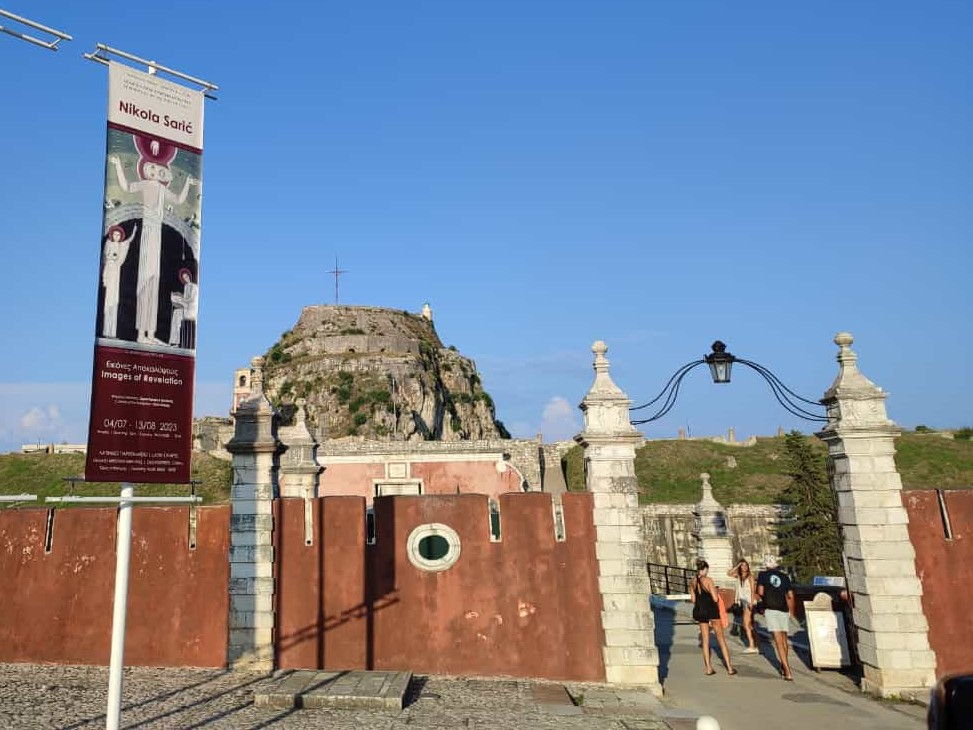
  Banner at the entrance of the Old Fortress of Corfu announcing the show of Nikola Saric

== Awards ==
- 2021 Special Prize (Sonderpreis) awarded by Hanns-Lilje-Stiftung, Hannover

== TV appearances ==
- 2018 Interview by Thomas Wollut with Nikola Sarić as part of the broadcast series Les chemins de la foi on TV France 2
- 2023 Television service with the participation of Nikola Sarić, the regional bishop Christian Kopp of Munich and pastor Stephanie Höhner on 6 March, broadcast live from church Himmelfahrtskirche München-Sendling by BR Fernsehen

== Trivia ==
For the purchase of three works by Nikola Sarić, the Musée Petit Palais in Paris made an exception to its principle of only purchasing works from the period up to 1914.

On 30 August 2018, the AfD politician Beatrix von Storch published posts on her social media channels in which she used a picture by Nikola Sarić without authorisation. The artist sued for injunctive relief and damages and won the legal dispute.

== Literature ==
- Jean-Marc Nemer: L’expérience contemporaine du sacré avec trois artistes - Edward Knippers, Nicolas Vaudroz et Nikola Sarić. Les Plans-sur-Bex 2025: Parole et Silence, ISBN 978-2-88959-641-6.
- François Bœspflug e Emanuela Fogliadini: Il battesimo di Cristo nell’arte, Milano 2021: Jaca Book, ISBN 9788816606562, p. 208-211.
- François Bœspflug e Emanuela Fogliadini: La risurrezione di Cristo nell’arte d’Oriente e d’Occidente, Milano 2019: Jaca Book, ISBN 9788816605916, p. 209-212.
- François Bœspflug avec la participation de Emanuela Fogliadini: Cruxifixion - la crucifixion dans l'art, un sujet planétaire, Montrouge: Bayard 2019, ISBN 9782227495029, p. 380–383.
- Zeugen – Gedichte von Nikola Đolović mit einigen Bildern von Nikola Sarić. In: Der schmale Pfad. volume 56. Johannes A. Wolff Verlag, Apelern 2016, ISSN 1610-1146, p. 60–75.
- Jean-Marc Nemer: Nikola Saric, un iconographe transgressif?, master thesis at the Faculty of Fine Arts and Art History at UFR04 - Université Panthéon-Sorbonne, 2016.
