= Émile Peynot =

French sculptor

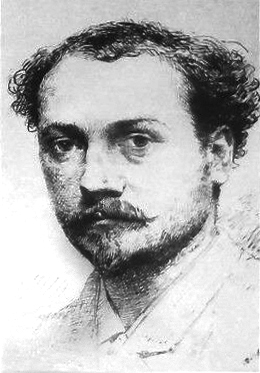
- Émile Peynot by Charles Mengin
- Born: Émile Edmond Peynot; November 22, 1850; Villeneuve-sur-Yonne
- Died: December 12, 1932 (aged 82); Paris, France
- Notable work: Sculpture
- Awards: Prix de Rome (1880)

Émile Edmond Peynot (French: [emil ɛdmɔ̃ pɛjno]; November 22, 1850 – December 12, 1932) was a prominent French artist sculptor and medallist.

== Bio ==
Peynot was born in Villeneuve-sur-Yonne, Burgundy.

He became well known following his Grand Prize at the Prix de Rome sculpture competition in 1880, and left a legacy of numerous monuments and reliefs in France as well as Argentina and Ecuador.

He created war memorials in Bar-le-Duc, Charenton-le-Pont, Ecouen, Joigny, Le Touquet-Paris-Plage, Liévin, Sens and for his home town, Villeneuve-sur-Yonne.

He died in Paris in 1932.

== Famous works ==
- Marianne, Place Carnot, Lyon.
- Monument to Henri Schneider, Le Creusot.
- Monument to François-Louis Français, Plombières-les-Bains, Vosges.
- Marchand Tunisien ("Tunisian Mechant"), portraying an Arab merchant cleaning his weapon.
- Tunisian Merchant, 1883, Brooklyn Museum, New York.
- La Aurora ("The Twilight"), Parque Centenario, Buenos Aires.
- Ofrenda Floral a Sarmiento ("Flowers for Sarmiento"), Palermo Rose Garden, Buenos Aires.
- La Lucha Eterna ("The Eternal Fight"), Parque El Ejido, Quito.
- Francia a la Argentina A gift from the French government created for Argentina centenary in 1910; it depicts two female figures, representing both countries, an angel of prosperity “Gloria” and four smaller figures: Science, Industry, Agriculture and the Arts.
Sculptures by Émile Peynot
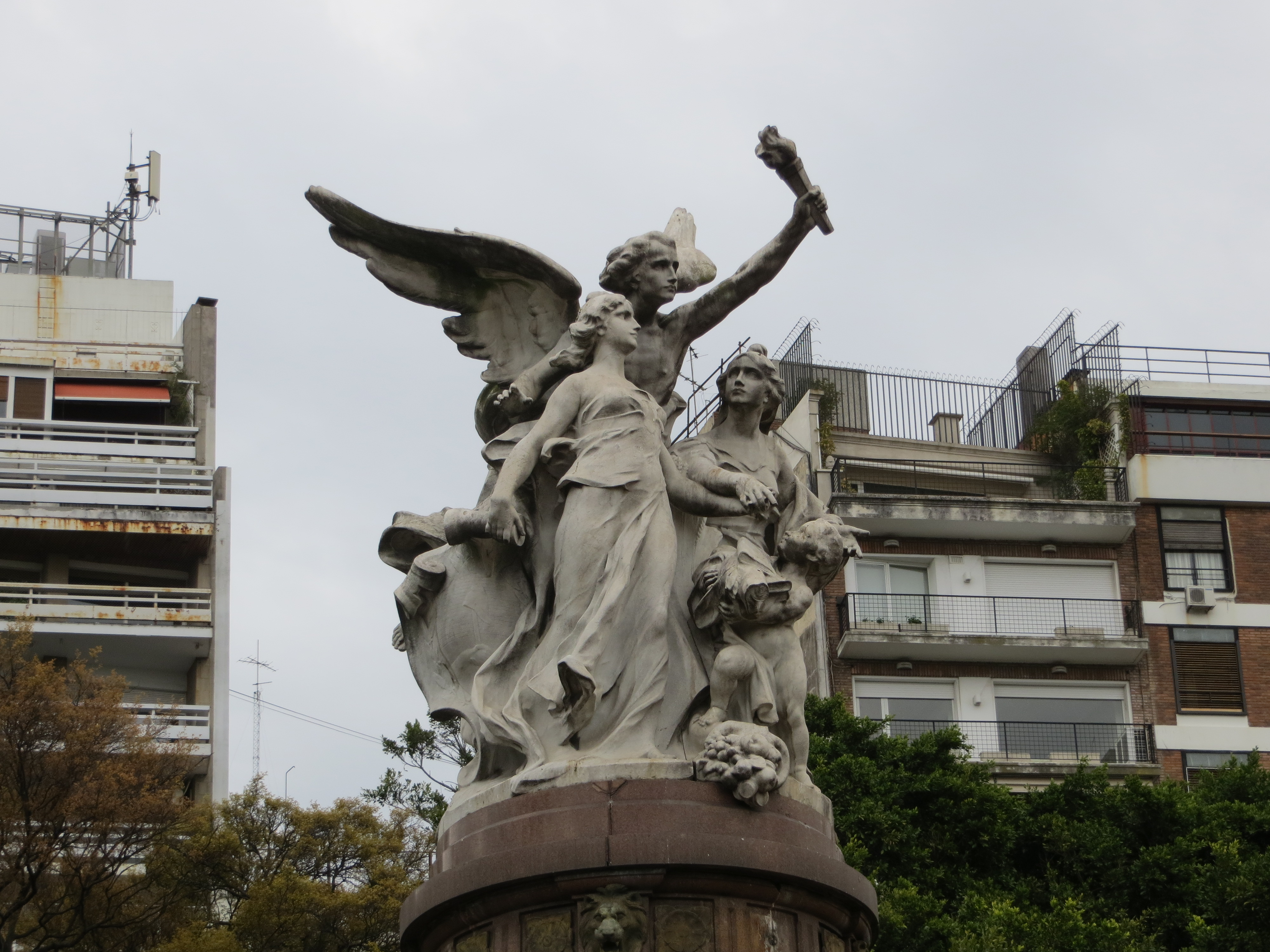
Francia a la Argentina, Buenos Aires

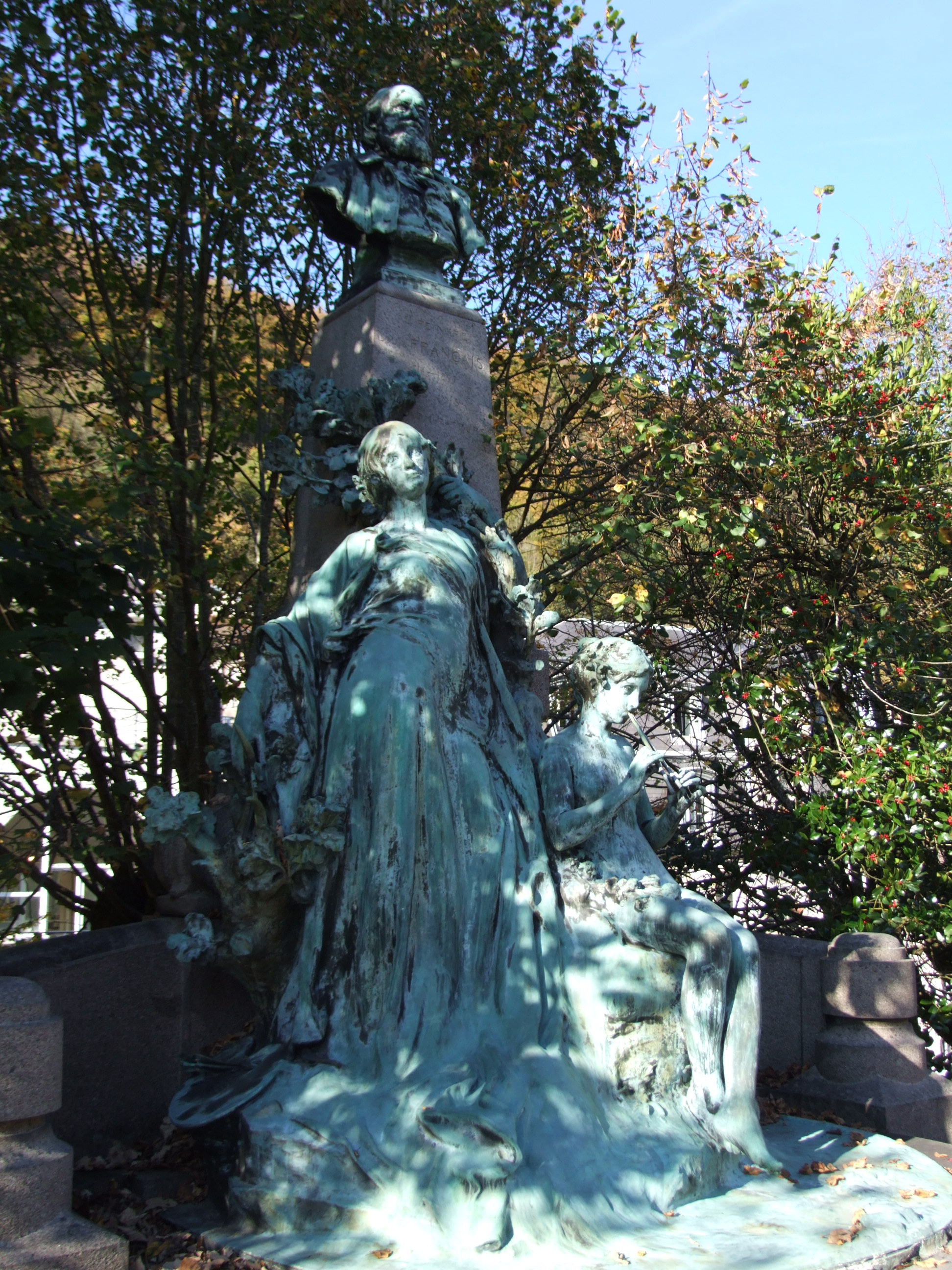
François-Louis Français, Plombières-les-Bains

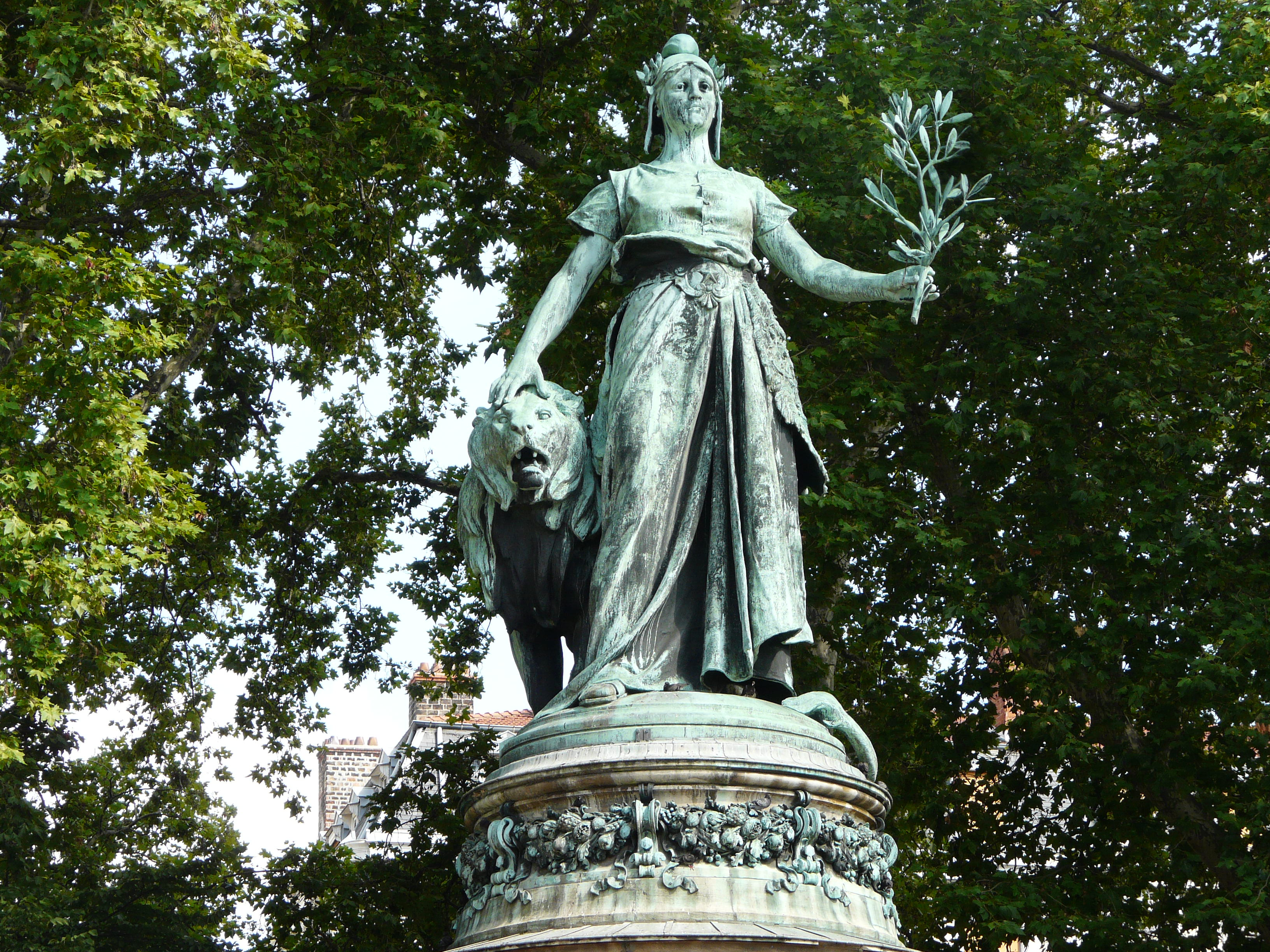
Marianne, Place Carnot, Lyon

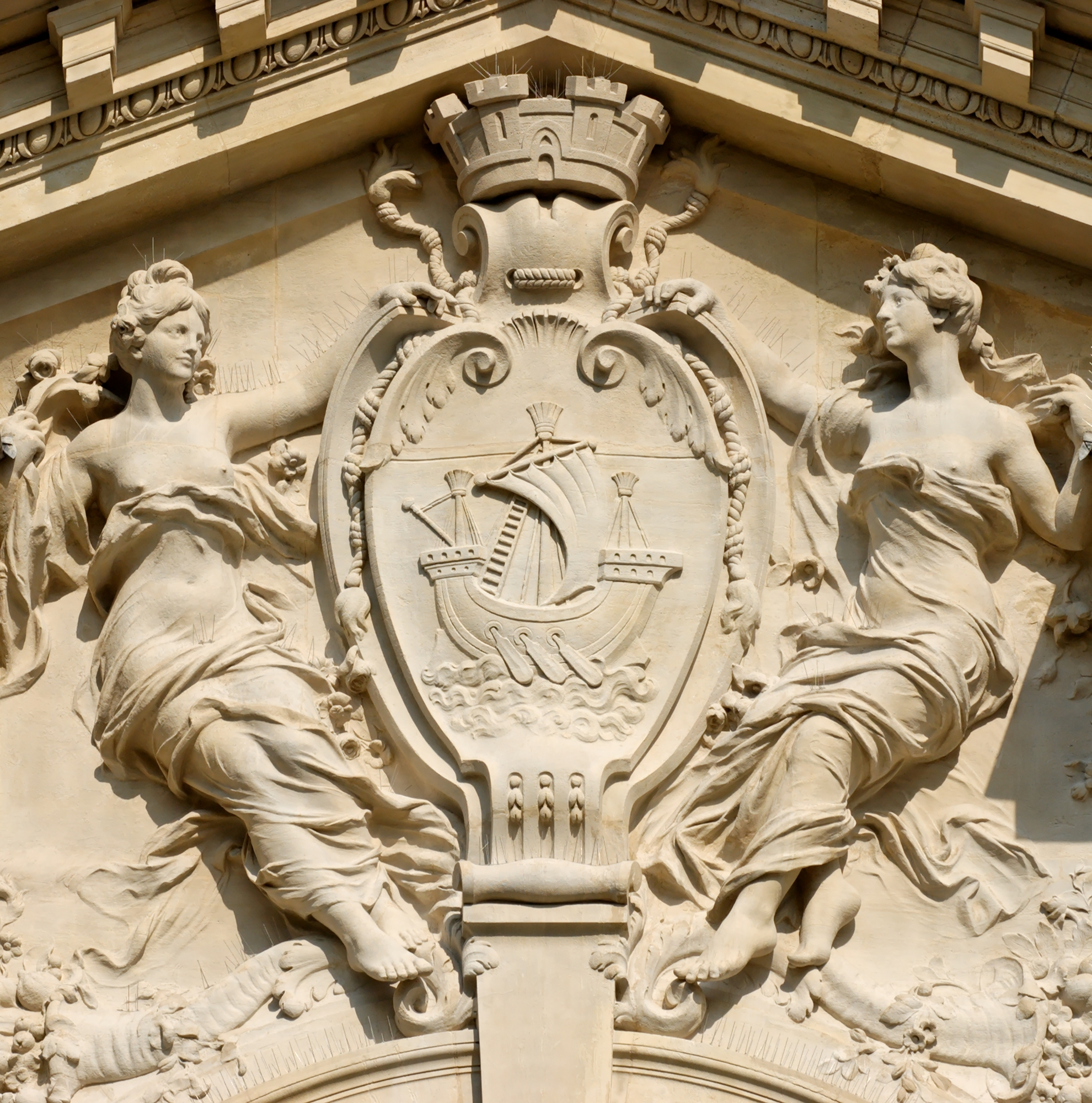
Shield of the City of Paris, Petit Palais

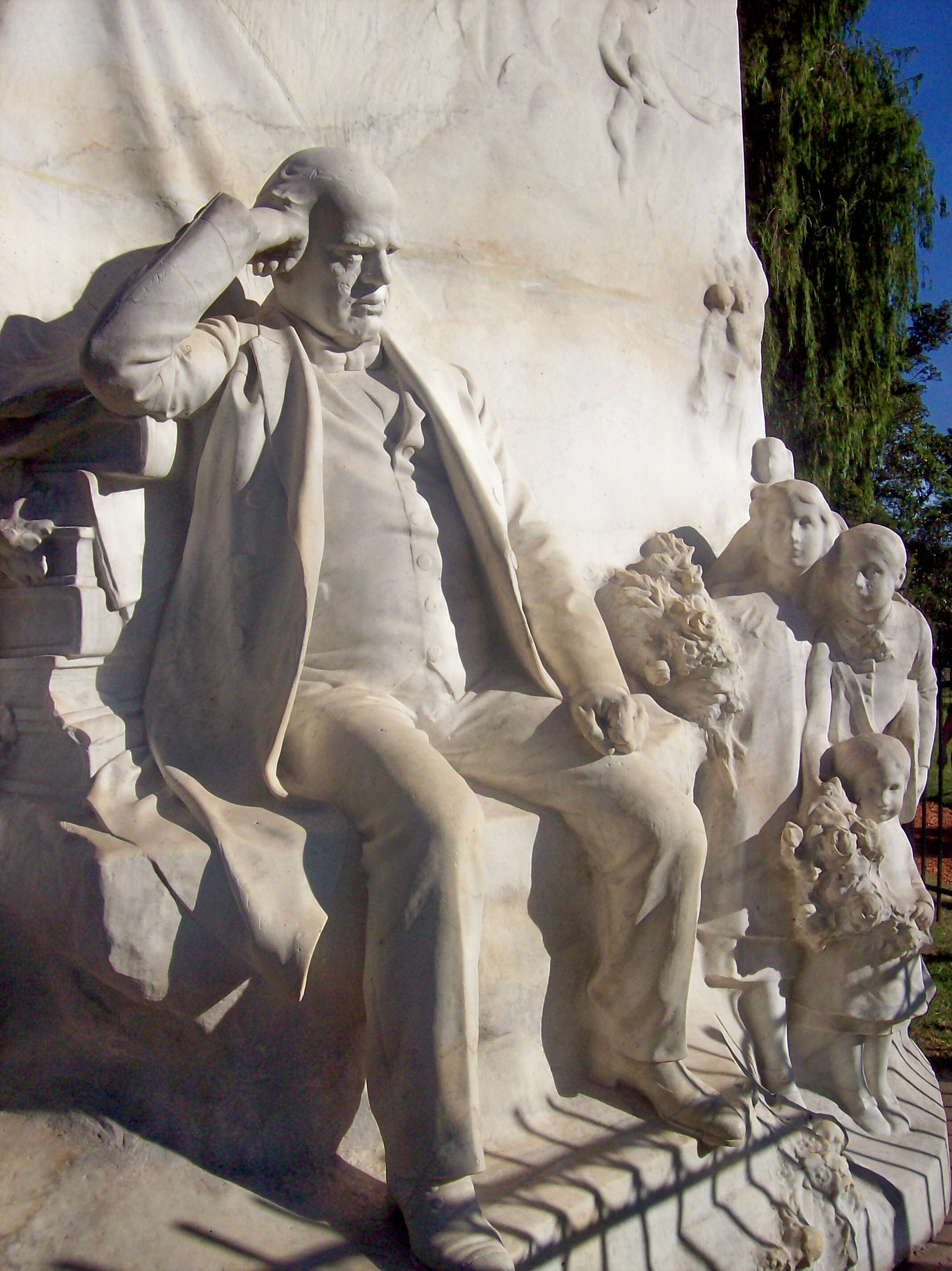
Monument to Domingo Sarmiento, Buenos Aires

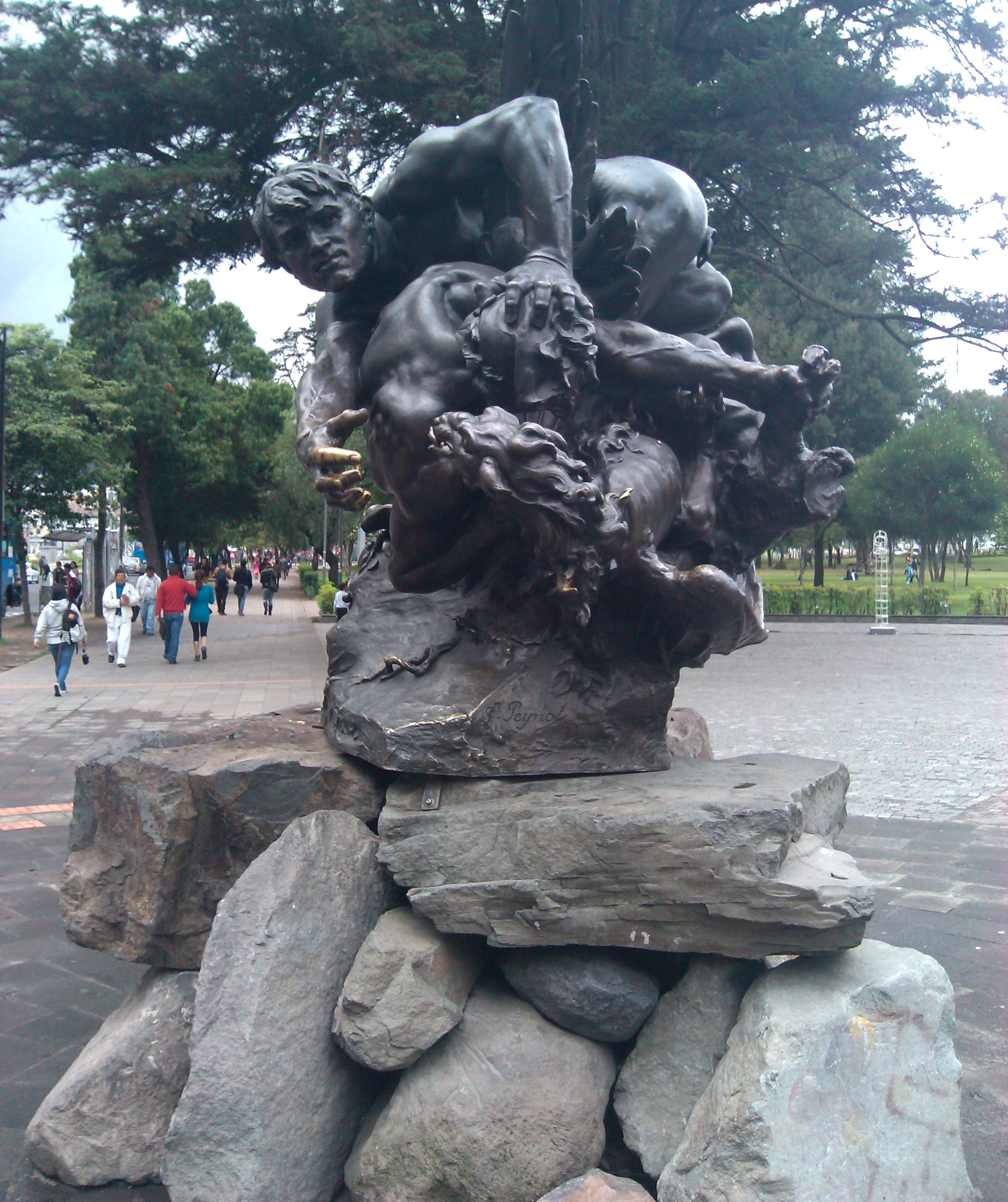
La Lucha Eterna (The Eternal Struggle), Quito

== See also ==
- Prix de Rome
- French art

== Bibliography ==
- Roland Conilleau, Emile Peynot, statuaire : Villeneuve-sur-Yonne 1850-1932, Clamecy, 2000, 77 p.
