= Parque El Ejido =

Public park in Quito, Ecuador

Coordinates: 0.2092°S 78.4986°W

El Ejido Park
- Parque El Ejido
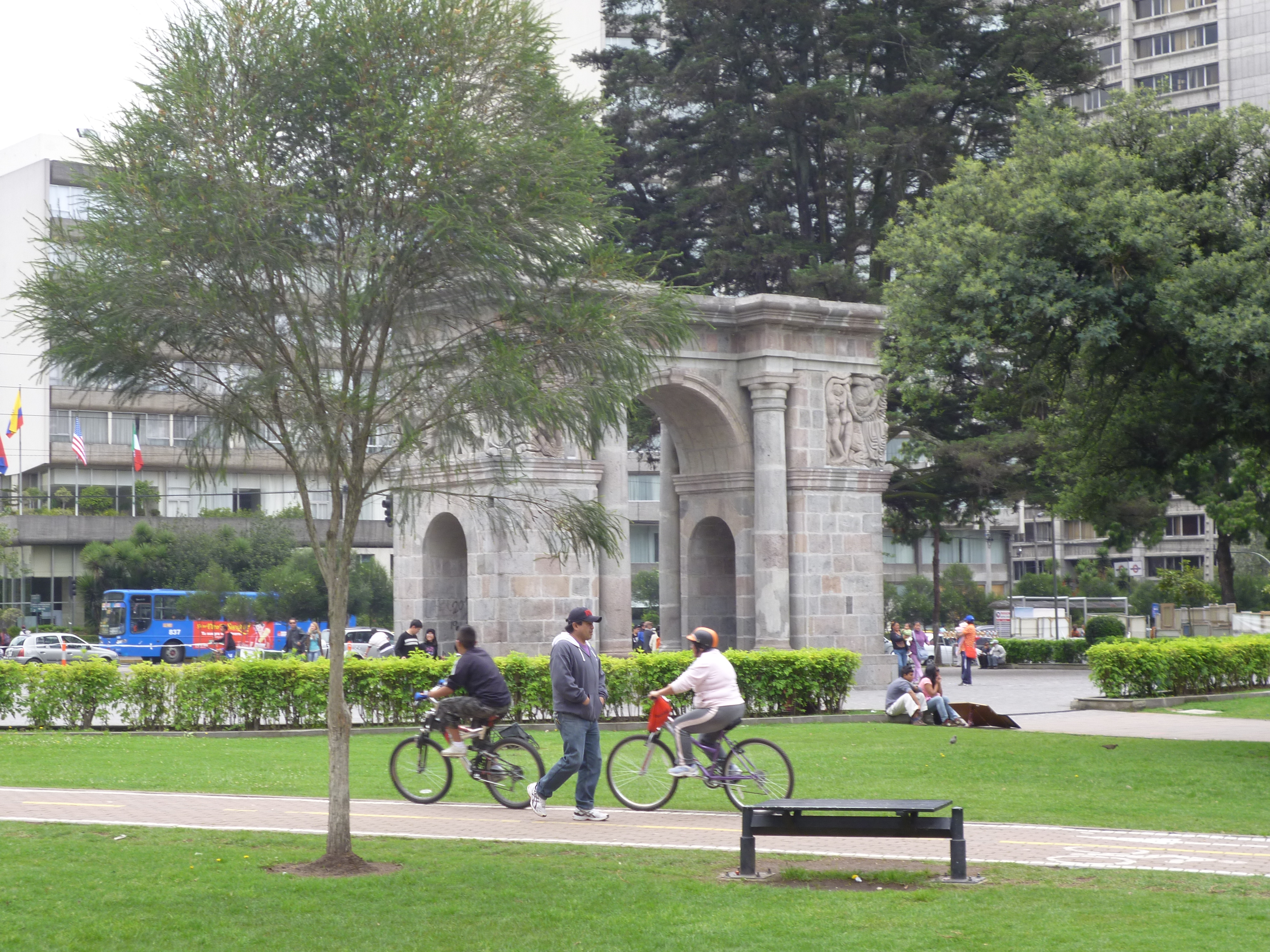
- View of the Parque El Ejido
- Type: Public park
- Location: Ecuador
- Area: 14,32 ha
- Created: January 25, 1535
- Awards: World Heritage Site
- Other information: Part of the Quito Historic Center, on the Metropolitan District of Quito

Parque El Ejido is a public park located along Avenue Patria in the Itchimbía neighborhood, in the Old Centre part of Quito, Ecuador. It is the third-largest park in the city. Estadio El Ejido is located nearby. The park hosts exhibitions on the weekend.

== History ==
On 25 January 1535, a few weeks after the Spanish foundation of Quito, the Cabildo established the boundaries of the so-called Ejidos del Rey, including the North Ejido (in Spanish: Eijido Norte) or Ejido of Añaquito, which as public property would be used for grazing horses and cattle for the next four centuries. This extended along the royal road between La Alameda and Cotocollao, and was in addition to two others, the Ejidos of Turubamba or South Ejido, and Conocoto or East Ejido.

It also served as a firing squad and punishment ground between the 16th and early 20th centuries, so that until the 1920s a pillory could still be found there, where criminals were traditionally hanged and punished. By order of President Gabriel García Moreno, it also became a burial place for dissidents, excommunicated people and Protestants.

By 1883, the area was still the northern limit of the city and still belonged to the Cabildo, but the citizens were already looking to expand the urban area towards the Iñaquito valley, using part of this municipal land to bring the city out of its centuries of confinement in the historic centre.

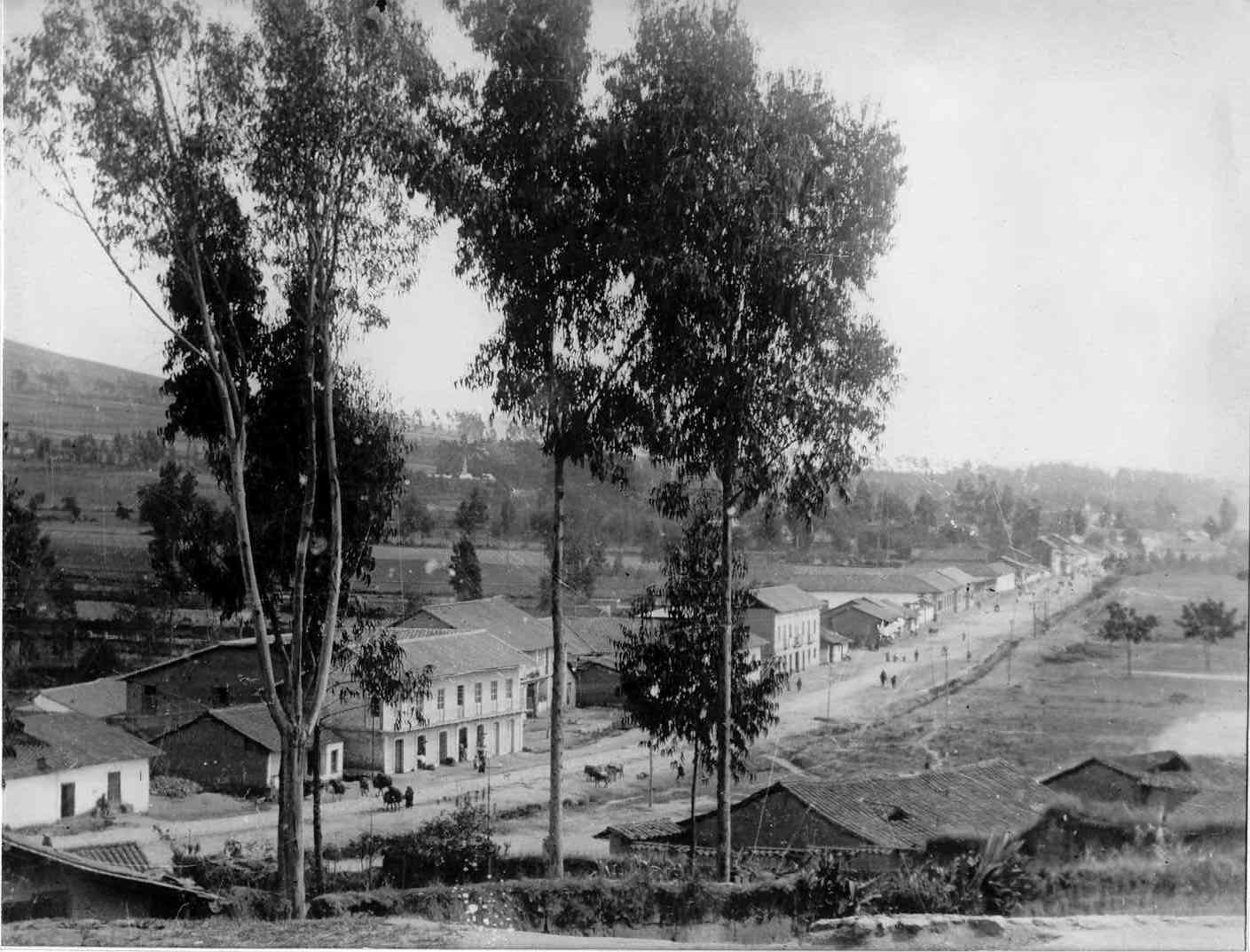
El Ejido at the beginning of the 20th century, before it became a park.

At the beginning of the 20th century, one of the most important historical events took place in what was still known as the North Ejido: on 28 January 1912, the so-called "La Hoguera Bárbara" took place, in which an angry mob burned the inert bodies of President Eloy Alfaro and three of his followers after dragging them through the streets from the García Moreno prison.

By 1914 the so-called Ciudadela Larrea, a neighbourhood full of stately mansions in the historicist styles fashionable at the beginning of the 20th century, had already been consolidated on the western side of the Ejido, while by the 1920s the wealthy neighbourhood of La Mariscal began to take shape to the north, where the palaces of Quito's aristocracy were surrounded for the first time by extensive gardens on all four sides.

Finally, in 1922, the North Ejido officially became a recreational green space for the city under the name of "Parque de Mayo" (May Park), since its tree planting and inauguration were part of the celebrations planned for the centenary of the Battle of Pichincha, which took place on 24 May 1822 and sealed the independence of present-day Ecuador. However, the name "El Ejido" always remained in popular culture, and was changed to this name a couple of decades later, which is how it is known to this day.

== Vegetation ==
The park is home to some 1,470 species of plants native to the inter-Andean region, including yellow trumptbush (cholán), alder, mountain papaya (chamburo), mountain coconut (coco cumbi) and pacay (guabo). A report for the construction of the Quito Metro's El Ejido station also provided data on the existence of the following tree species: acacia, white brush, cedar, arupo, cypress, yalomán, eucalyptus, walnut, cedrillo, red pine, plantain, poplar, capulí, pyramidal willow and lime.

In addition, El Ejido constitutes the public space with the highest concentration of heritage trees in the Metropolitan District of Quito, which means that it has at least a couple of dozen trees over a hundred years old.

== Infrastructure ==
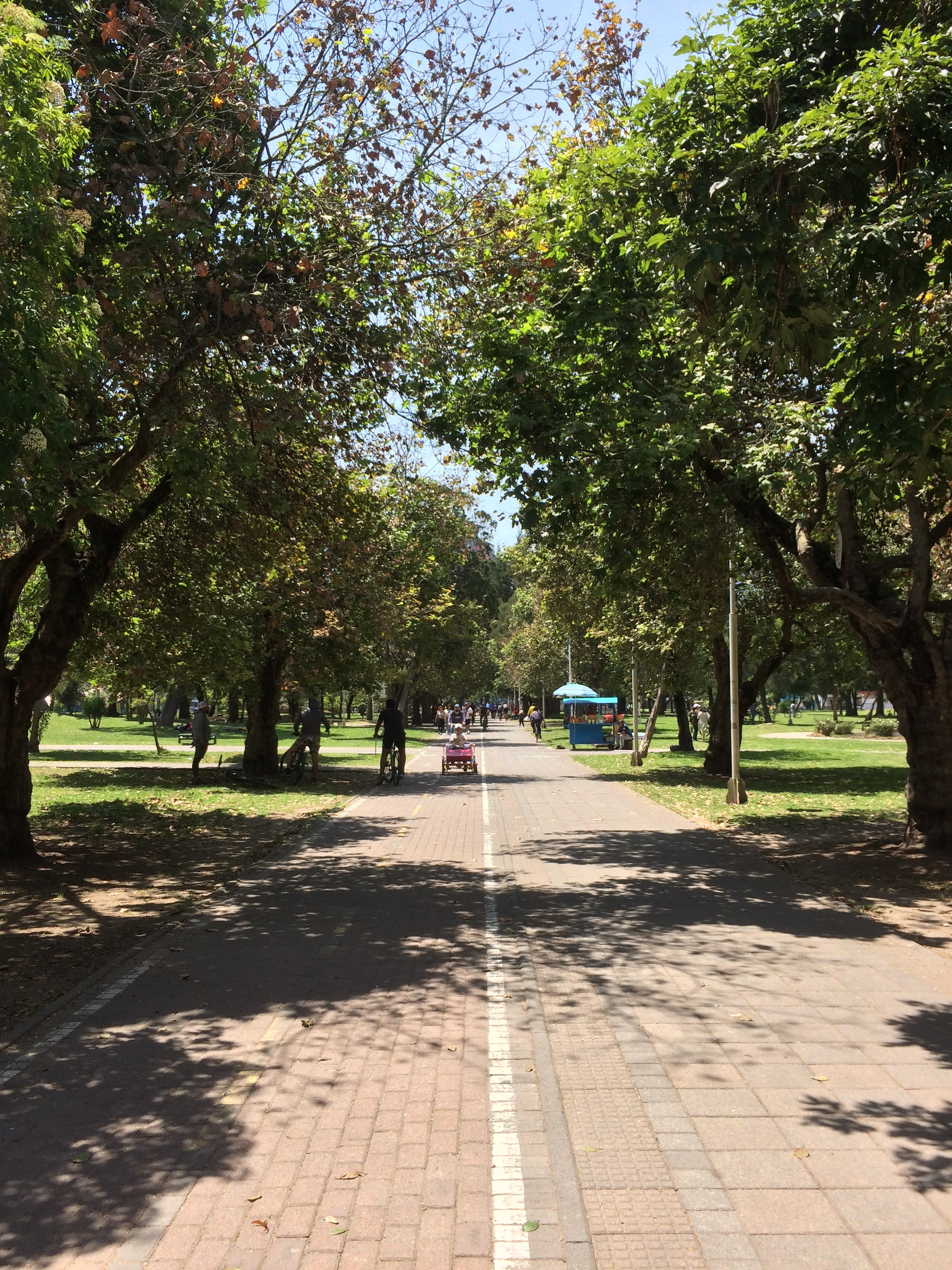
One of the several paths that run through the park.

The park's design is typical of late 19th and early 20th century European urbanism, with an asymmetrical layout of curved pathways that meet in an eccentric circle at the centre of the terrain, thus linking the interior of the green and landscaped area with the four road arteries that delimit its trapezoidal shape.

Every weekend, a large open-air gallery where art and handicrafts are exhibited and sold is set up along the boulevard on Patria Avenue. The park also has internal spaces used by street artists to stage their performances, as well as an open-air food court serving traditional Ecuadorian dishes, which has been in operation since the 1960s.

In the northwest are the sports courts, used especially for traditional Quito games such as ecuavoley and the so-called "cocos", the latter aiming to pull small coconuts out of a circle traced in the ground, using large metal balls; both involve bets of 10 to 50 dollars per game. There are also areas dedicated to children's games such as slides, swings, seesaws and jungle gyms.

At the end of 2016, the exterior perimeter of the park was rehabilitated for the Habitat III Conference that took place in the city during the month of October of that year, including the construction of access routes for the disabled, the laying of setts to level pavements, the improvement of the window boxes located on the side of Patria Avenue, the improvement of the park's peripheral lighting, and the maintenance and replacement of the sculptures inside the park.

=== Sculptures ===
Sculptures inside El Ejido
Image	Work	Sculptor	Location	Fabrication	Placement
	Puerta de La Circasiana	Luis Mideros	Boulevard of Patria Avenue	1925	1980
	La Lucha Eterna	Émile Peynot	Boulevard of Patria Avenue	1922	2014
	Monument to Velasco Ibarra		Plaza of Tarqui Avenue	1997	2005
	Paraboloide hiperbólico	Agustín Patiño	Plaza of Tarqui Avenue	1961	1961
	Bust of Juan Montalvo	Luis Mideros	South gardens of Tarqui Avenue		
	Monument to Humboldt		South part of the park		
	Monument to Eloy Alfaro		Central part of the park		
	La Llama Eterna		Central part of the park		
	A César Vallejo	Miguel Baca Rossi	Plaza next to 6 de Diciembre Avenue		May 31, 2002
	Monument to César Dávila Andrade		Plaza next to 6 de Diciembre Avenue		
	Monument to Sándor Petőfi		Plaza next to 6 de Diciembre Avenue		
	Bust of Fiódor Dostoyevski		Plaza next to 6 de Diciembre Avenue		
	Bust of José Enrique Rodó		Plaza next to 6 de Diciembre Avenue		
	Bust of Jorge Carrera Andrade	Jesús Cobo	Plaza next to 6 de Diciembre Avenue		September of 2002
	Bust of Jacinto Jijón y Caamaño		Boulevard of Patria Avenue		2016
	Monument to María Angélica Idrobo		Boulevard of Patria Avenue		2016

== Bibliography ==
- Gomezjurado Zevallos, Javier (2015). Quito: historia del Cabildo y la ciudad (in Spanish). Quito: Instituto Metropolitano de Patrimonio. ISBN 978-9942-20-821-7.
