= Šarić =

Šarić (Serbian Cyrillic: Шарић, pronounced [ʃǎːritɕ]; sometimes spelled Saric or Sharich in English) is a surname common in Croatia, Bosnia and Herzegovina, Montenegro and Serbia.

It is the second most common surname in the Zadar County of Croatia, and among the most frequent ones in another county.

It may refer to:

- Aleksandar Šarić (born 1974), Serbian footballer
- Asif Šarić (born 1965), Bosnian football player and manager
- Cvijan Šarić (fl. 1652–1668), Venetian commander
- Daniel Šarić (born 1972), Croatian former footballer
- Danijel Šarić (handballer) (born 1977), Bosnian Serb handball player
- Dario Šarić (born 1994), Croatian basketball player, son of Predrag
- Dario Šarić (born 1997), Bosnian footballer
- Darko Šarić (born 1969), Serbian suspected drug trafficker
- Dimitrije Šarić (born 2008), Serbian footballer
- Domagoj Šarić (born 1999), Croatian basketball player
- Dragana Šarić (known as Bebi Dol, born 1962), Serbian singer songwriter and actress
- Dragiša Šarić (1961–2008), Serbian basketball player
- Igor Šarić (born 1967), Croatian tennis player
- Ivan Šarić (disambiguation), several people
- Kenan Šarić (born 1997), Bosnian footballer
- Marko Šarić (born 1998), Serbian footballer
- Martin Šarić (born 1979), Argentine footballer
- Mirko Šarić (1978–2000), Argentine footballer
- Miroslav Šarić (born 1986), Croatian footballer
- Nenad Šarić (1947–2012), Croatian musician, drummer of Novi Fosili
- Predrag Šarić (born 1959), Croatian basketball player, father of Dario
- Samir Šarić (born 1984), Bosnian footballer
- Sandra Šarić (born 1984), Croatian taekwondo athlete
- Tomislav Šarić (born 1990), Croatian footballer
- Velma Šarić (born 1979), Bosnian journalist
- Veselinka Šarić née Crvak (born 1971), Croatian basketball player
