= François Bœspflug =

French historian

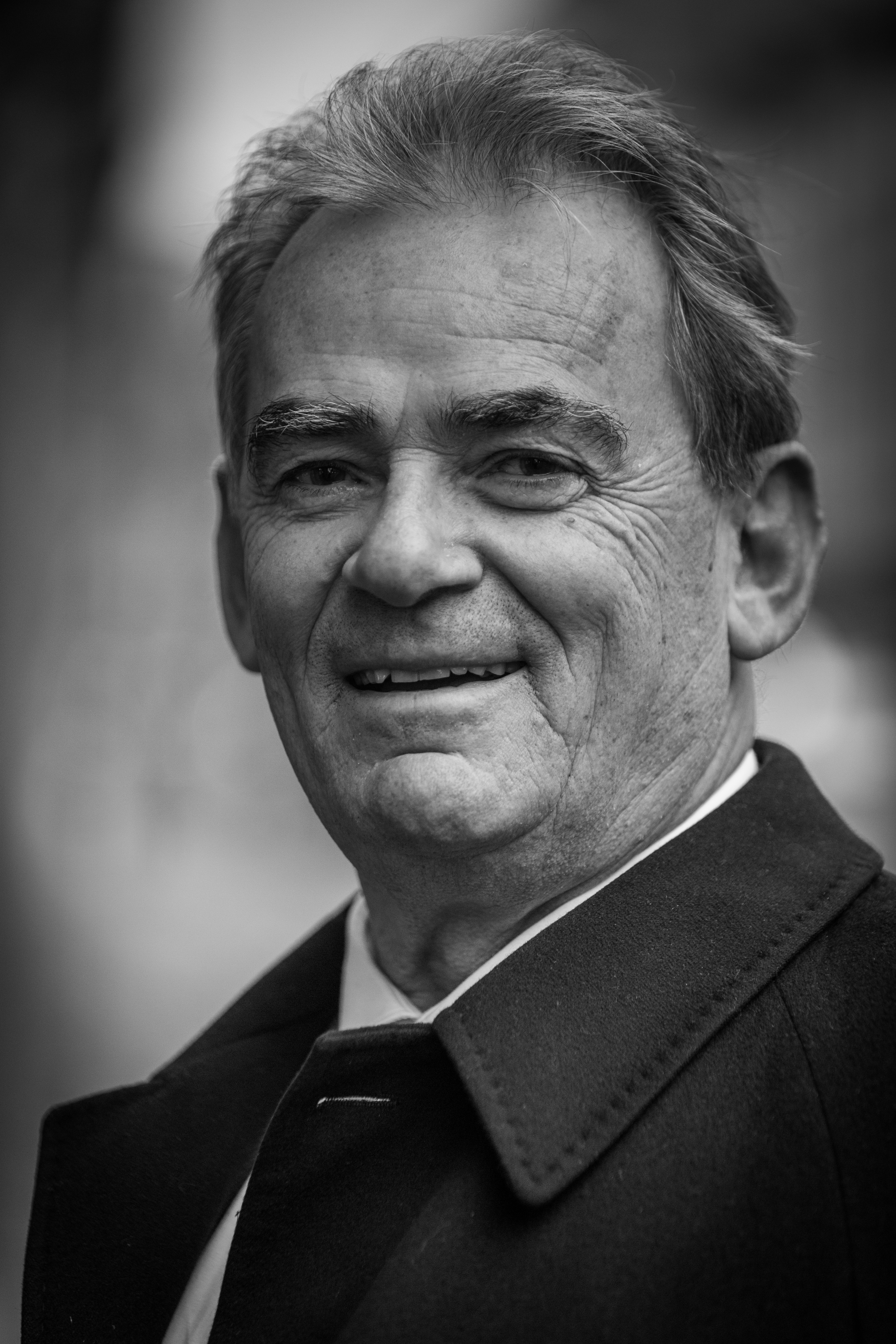
- Born: 30 May 1945 (age 81)

Academic background
- Education: l'École nationale supérieure des mines de Saint-Étienne; Catholic University of Paris

Academic work
- Discipline: history theology
- Institutions: University of Strasbourg; Centre Sèvres; University of Geneva; Free University of Brussels; School for Advanced Studies in the Social Sciences; Catholic University of Paris; Éditions du Cerf
- Main interests: iconography of the Bible moralisée

François Bœspflug (born 30 May 1945) is a French historian of Christianity and Christian art, in particular of the Middle Ages. He specialises in the iconography of the Bible moralisée.

== Biography ==
=== Education ===
François Bœspflug undertook a scientific curriculum that led him to the l'École nationale supérieure des mines de Saint-Étienne, where he was a student from 1964 to 1965. From 1969 to 1975, he obtained a degree in scholastic philosophy and a master's degree in theology from the Catholic University of Paris. In 1982, he obtained two postgraduate doctorates after having defended his doctoral thesis on "Dieu dans l’art" ("God in Art"), subsequently going on to publish numerous works on Christian iconography. He also pursued research on the history of representations of God and the Trinity in Medieval Europe.

=== Teaching ===
Bœspflug has been a lecturer at the Catholic University of Paris (1984-1987), lecturer at the School for Advanced Studies in the Social Sciences (1987-1990), professor of the history or religions at the Faculté de théologie catholique de Strasbourg (1990-2013), and professor and/or director of research at the Centre Sèvres, Institut de recherche et d'histoire des textes, University of Geneva, and Free University of Brussels (1994-2008).

=== Religious Order ===
Bœspflug was a priest and member of the Dominican Order 1965 to 2015. He was holder of the seat of Pope Benedict XVI in Regensburg in 2013 and was a literary director at the religious publishing house Éditions du Cerf from 1982 to 1999. He left the Dominican order and the priesthood when he married in 2015 and he divorced in 2024. He lives in a EHPAD in Lyon.

=== Views ===
Bœspflug denounces the celibacy of men of the Church, and regularly intervenes in the media on questions relating to the Catholic Church, but also more generally on the representations of the divine in all religions.

== Works ==
- François Boespflug; Eberhard König; Bibliothèque nationale de France; Biblioteca nazionale di Torino; Musée du Louvre (1998). Les "Très belles heures" de Jean de France, duc de Berry: un chef-d'oeuvre au sortir du Moyen âge. Paris: Éditions du Cerf. ISBN 9782204054164. OCLC 504037403.
- François Boespflug (2007). La caricatura e il sacro: Islam, ebraismo e cristianisimo a confronto. Transizioni (Vita e pensiero (Firm). Vol. 21. Vita e Pensiero. ISBN 9788834313824.
- François Boespflug; Bérénice Levet (2011). La pensée des images: entretiens sur Dieu dans l'art, avec Bérénice Levet (in French). Montrouge: Bayard. ISBN 9782227482852. OCLC 780277957.
- François Boespflug; Évelyne Martini (2012). Franc-Parler: Du christianisme dans la société d'aujourd'hui (in French). Montrouge: Bayard. ISBN 9782227485099. OCLC 812569828.
- François Boespflug (2016). Pourquoi j'ai quitté l'Ordre... et comment il m'a quitté (in French). Paris: J.C. Béhar. ISBN 9782915543513. OCLC 1060177886.
- Bœspflug, François; Fogliadini, Emanuela (2019). Cruxifixion - la crucifixion dans l'art, un sujet planétaire. Montrouge: Bayard. ISBN 9782227495029. OCLC 1127756076.
- Bœspflug, François; Fogliadini, Emanuela (2020). La risurrezione di Cristo nell'arte d'Oriente e d'Occidente. Mailand: Jaca Book. ISBN 9788816605916.
- Bœspflug, François; Fogliadini, Emanuela (2021). Il battesimo di Cristo. Mailand: Jaca Book. ISBN 9788816606562.

== Participations ==
- 2004 : Lettres à Dieu, collectif, Calmann-Lévy.
- 2004 : Religions, les mots pour en parler. Notions fondamentales en Histoire des religions, F. Boespflug, Th. Legrand et A.-L. Zwilling, Paris / Genève, Bayard / Labor et Fides. ISBN 978-2227487260

== Tribute ==
- Deneken, Michel; Legrand, Thierry; Zwilling, Anne-Laure, eds. (2015). Une certaine image de Dieu, Hommage à François Bœspflug. Presses universitaires de Strasbourg. ISBN 9782868209375.
