= Kenan Šarić =

Bosnian footballer (born 1977)

Personal information
- Date of birth: 18 December 1997 (age 28)
- Place of birth: Sarajevo, Bosnia and Herzegovina
- Height: 1.83 m (6 ft 0 in)
- Position: Left winger

Team information
- Current team: Čelik Zenica
- Number: 17

Senior career*
Years	Team	Apps	(Gls)
2015–2016	Radnik Hadžići		
2016–2017	Famos Hrasnica		
2017–2018	Bosna Visoko		
2018–2020	Zvijezda Gradačac		
2020–2021	Radnik Bijeljina	14	(2)
2021	Mladost Doboj Kakanj	11	(0)
2021–2022	Radnik Bijeljina	18	(3)
2023–	Čelik Zenica	0	(0)
- * Club domestic league appearances and goals as of 17:42, 3 July 2023 (CET)

Kenan Šarić (born 18 December 1997) is a Bosnian professional footballer who plays as a left winger for Čelik Zenica.

== Career ==
On 26 January 2021, Šarić joined Bosnian Premier League side Mladost Doboj Kakanj mid-2020–21 season from Radnik Bijeljina. He left the club in June 2021 after the club was unable to obtain a league license for the following season. Šarić scored two goals and made three assists in the 2020–21 season for both clubs.

On 30 June 2021, Šarić returned to Radnik Bijeljina. Despite being a key player for the club during the 2021–22 season, scoring three goals in 19 games, his side was relegated; he left the club in summer 2022.

== Style of play ==
Šarić is a fast left winger.
