= Ivan Šarić =

Ivan Šarić or Ivan Saric may refer to:

- Ivan Šarić (archbishop) (1871–1960), Roman Catholic Archbishop of Vrhbosna, Bosnia and Herzegovina
- Ivan Šarić (chess player) (born 1990), Croatian chess player
- Ivan Šarić (footballer) (born 2001), Croatian football player
- Ivan Šarić (comedian) (born 1985), Croatian comedian who hosted the TV show Hrvatska traži zvijezdu
- Ivan Šarić (politician), head of the Central Bosnia Canton, 1996–97
- Ivan Sarić (1876–1966), sportsman and inventor from Subotica
