= Petit Palais =

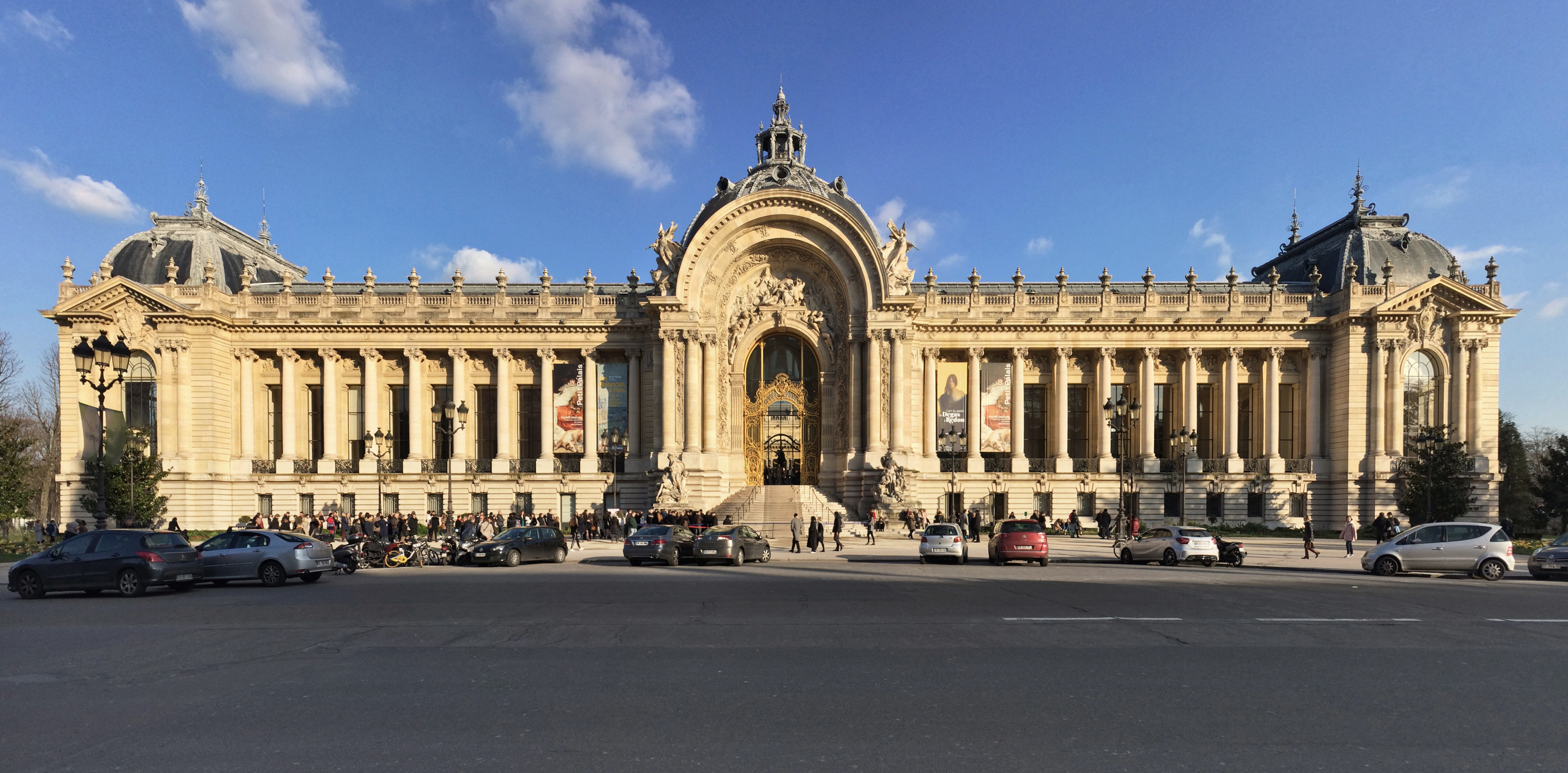
- The Petit Palais in 2018
- Established: Universal Exposition of 1900
- Location: Avenue Winston-Churchill, 75008 Paris, France
- Coordinates: 48°51′58″N 2°18′52″E
- Type: Historic site, exhibition hall
- Visitors: 1,187,637 (2023)
- Architect: Charles Girault
- Public transit access: Champs-Élysées–Clemenceau; Franklin D. Roosevelt
- Website: www.petitpalais.paris.fr

The Petit Palais (French: [p(ə)ti palɛ]; English: Small Palace) is an art museum in the 8th arrondissement of Paris, France.

Built for the 1900 Exposition Universelle ("universal exhibition"), it now houses the City of Paris Museum of Fine Arts (Musée des beaux-arts de la ville de Paris). The Petit Palais is located across from the Grand Palais on the former Avenue Nicolas II, today Avenue Winston-Churchill. The other façades of the building face the Seine and Avenue des Champs-Élysées.

The Petit Palais is one of fourteen museums of the City of Paris that have been incorporated since 1 January 2013 in the public corporation Paris Musées. It has been listed since 1975 as a monument historique by the Ministry of Culture.

== History ==
=== Design competition ===
In 1894 a competition was held for the 1900 Exhibition area. The Palais de l'Industrie from the 1855 World's Fair was considered unfitting and was to be replaced by something new for the 1900 Exhibition. Architects had the option to do what they pleased (alter, destroy, or keep) with the Palais de l'Industrie. In the end, Charles Girault won the competition and built the Petit Palais as one of the buildings that replaced the Palais de l’industrie .

The construction of the Petit Palais began on 10 October 1897 and was completed in April 1900. The total cost of the Petit Palais at the time of the construction was 400,000 pounds sterling. In 1902, the Petit Palais officially became the Palais des Beaux-Arts de la Ville de Paris.

=== Inspiration ===
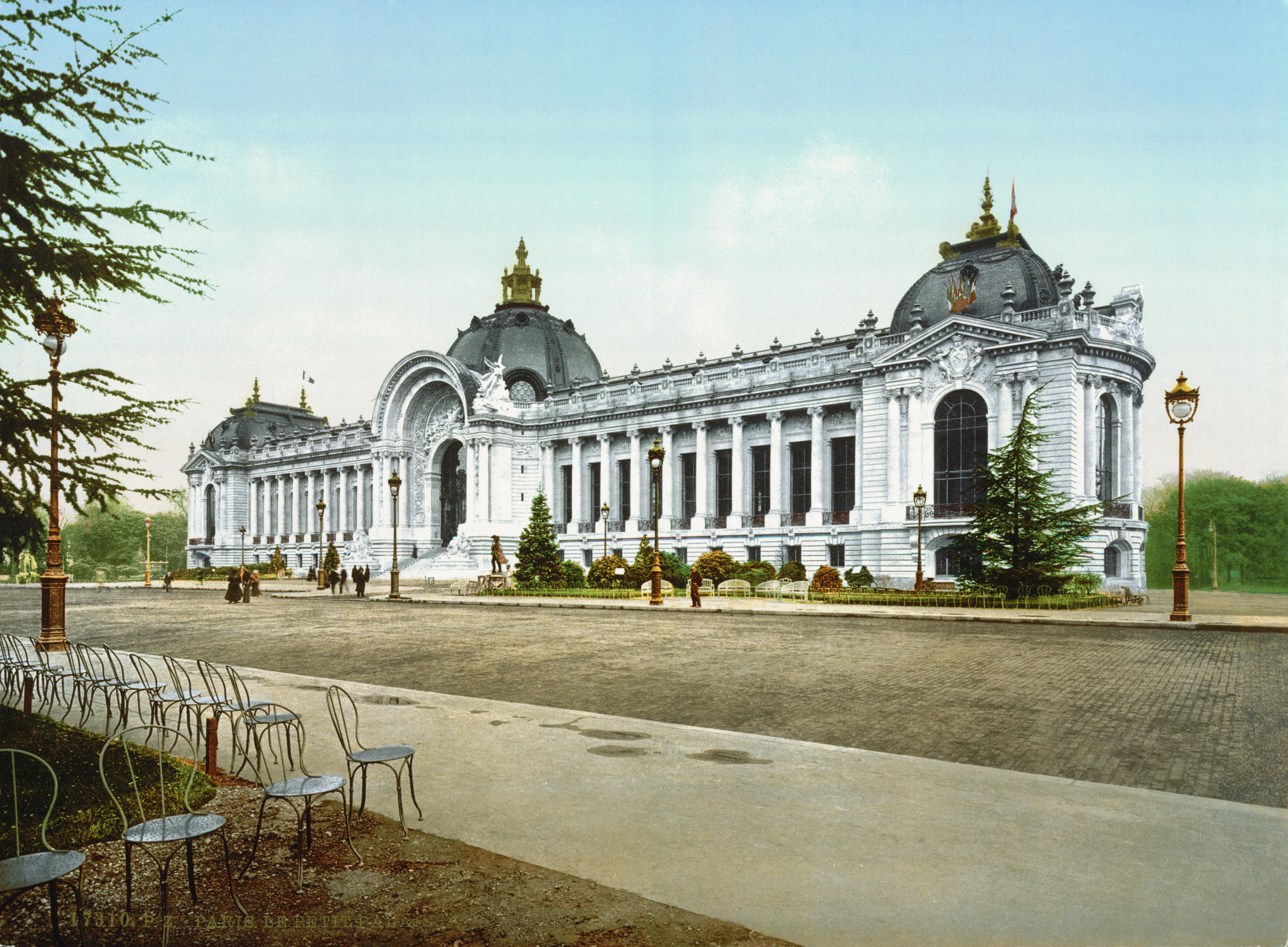
The Petit Palais in 1900

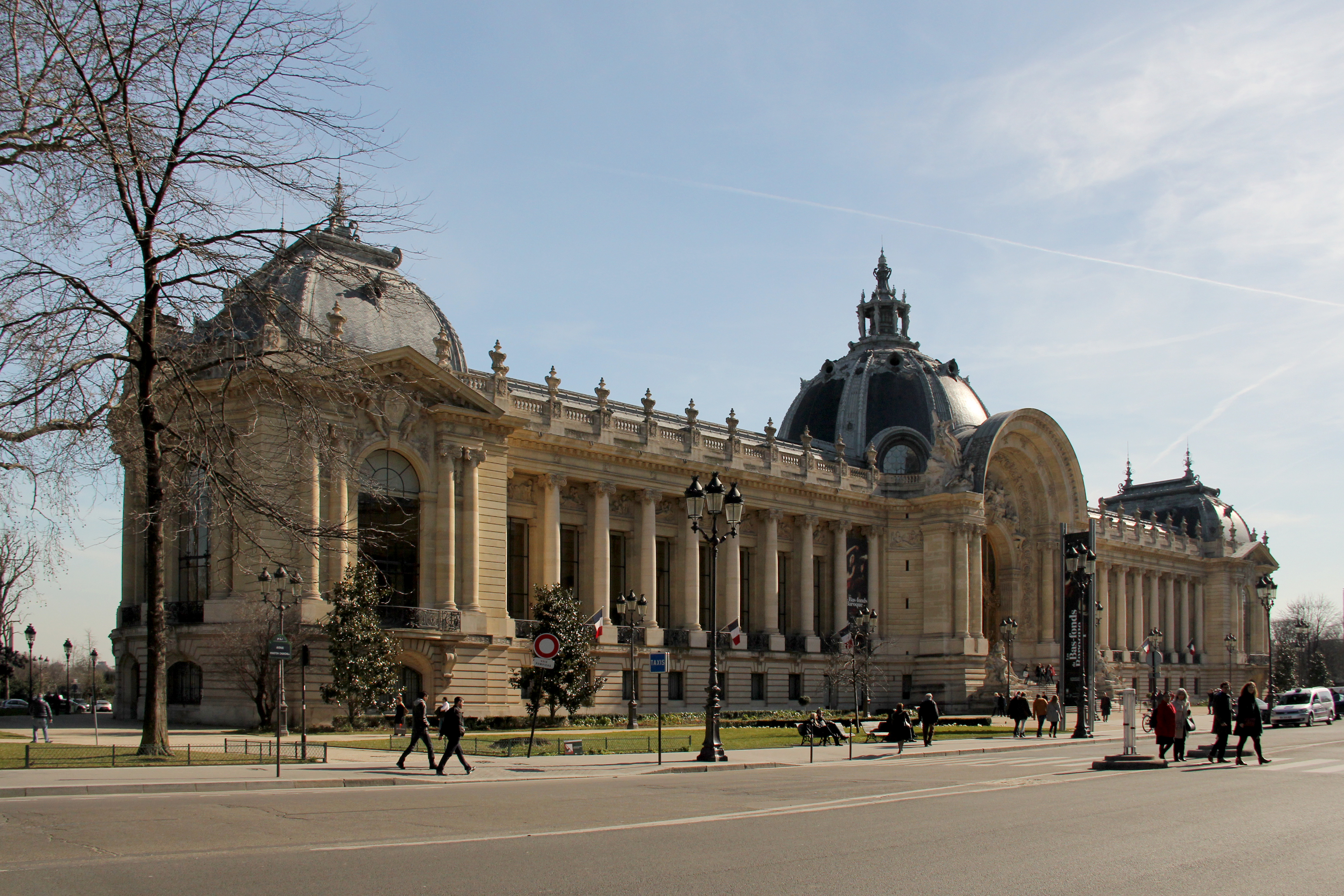
The Petit Palais in 2015

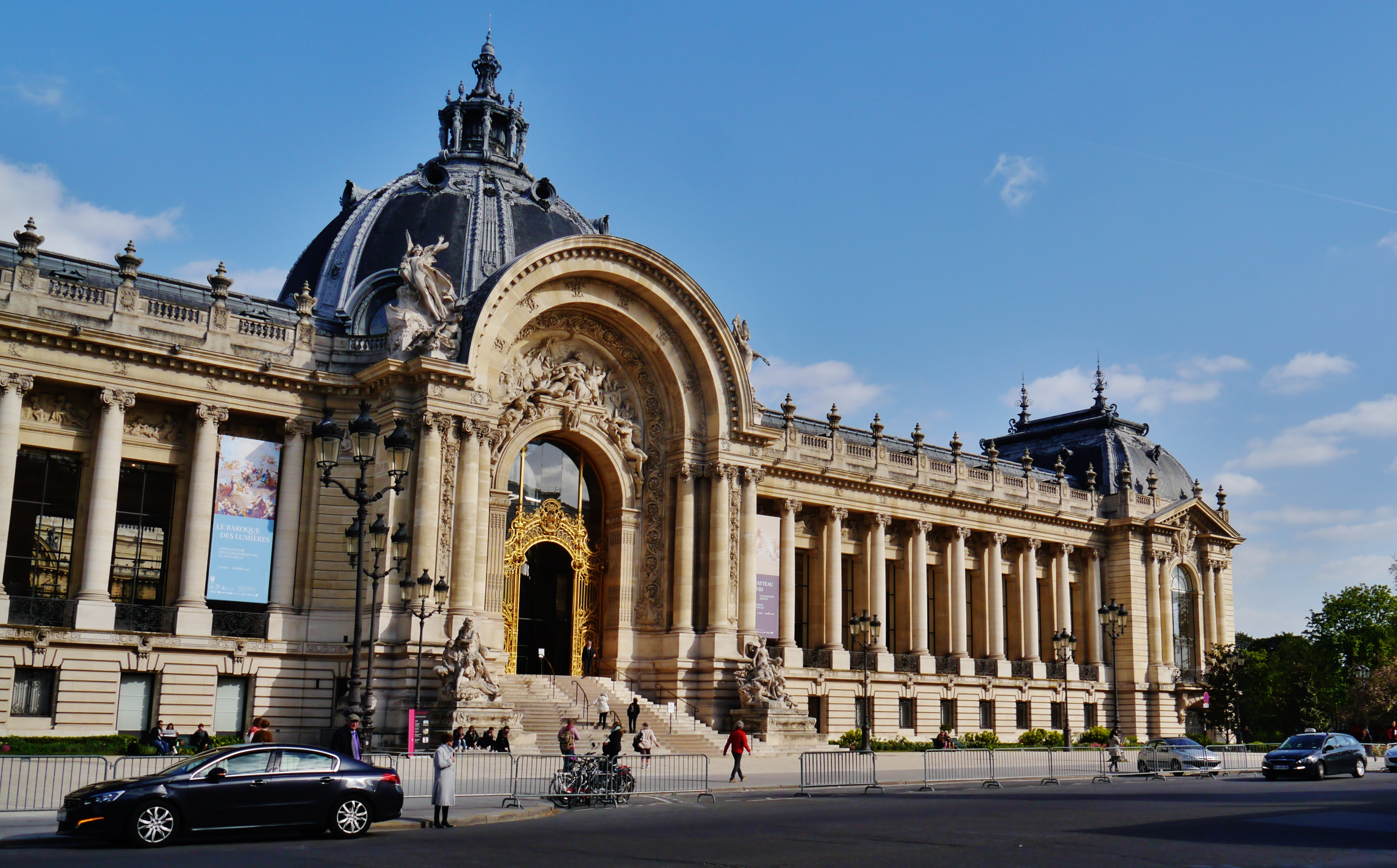
Petit Palais façade in 2017

Girault largely draws on the late 17th and early 18th century French style for the Petit Palais. Additionally his work, such as the domed central porch and the triple arcade, has many references to the stables at the Château de Chantilly.

=== Plan of the building ===
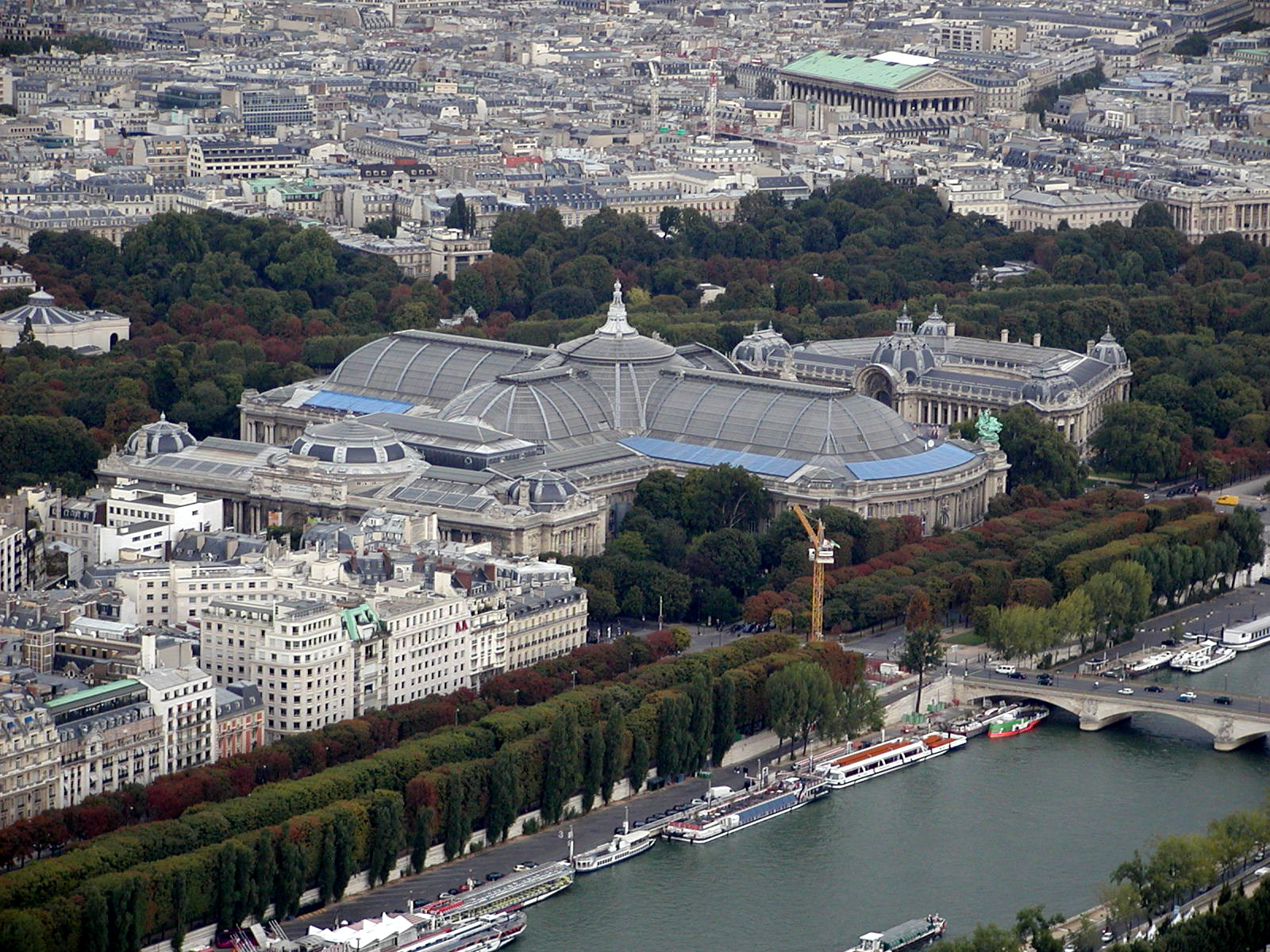
The Petit Palais next to the Grand Palais. View from the Eiffel Tower.

Girault's plan for the Petit Palais had minimal alterations from the design to the execution. The plan was original and fit perfectly in its given location. The Petit Palais is a trapezoid shape with its larger side as the main façade facing the Grand Palais. The building's shape makes a semi-circular courtyard at the center.

== Architecture ==
The Beaux-Arts style Petit Palais was designed by Charles Girault, and is around an octi-circular courtyard and garden, similar to the Grand Palais. Its ionic columns, grand porch, and dome echo those of Les Invalides across the river. The tympanum depicting the city of Paris surrounded by muses is the work of sculptor Jean Antoine Injalbert.

The Petit Palais was built to be a lasting building that would become a permanent fine arts museum after the exhibition. The materials of the building—stone, steel and concrete as well as the decoration were to demonstrate that the Petit Palais was built to be enduring.

=== Exterior ===
==== Main façade ====
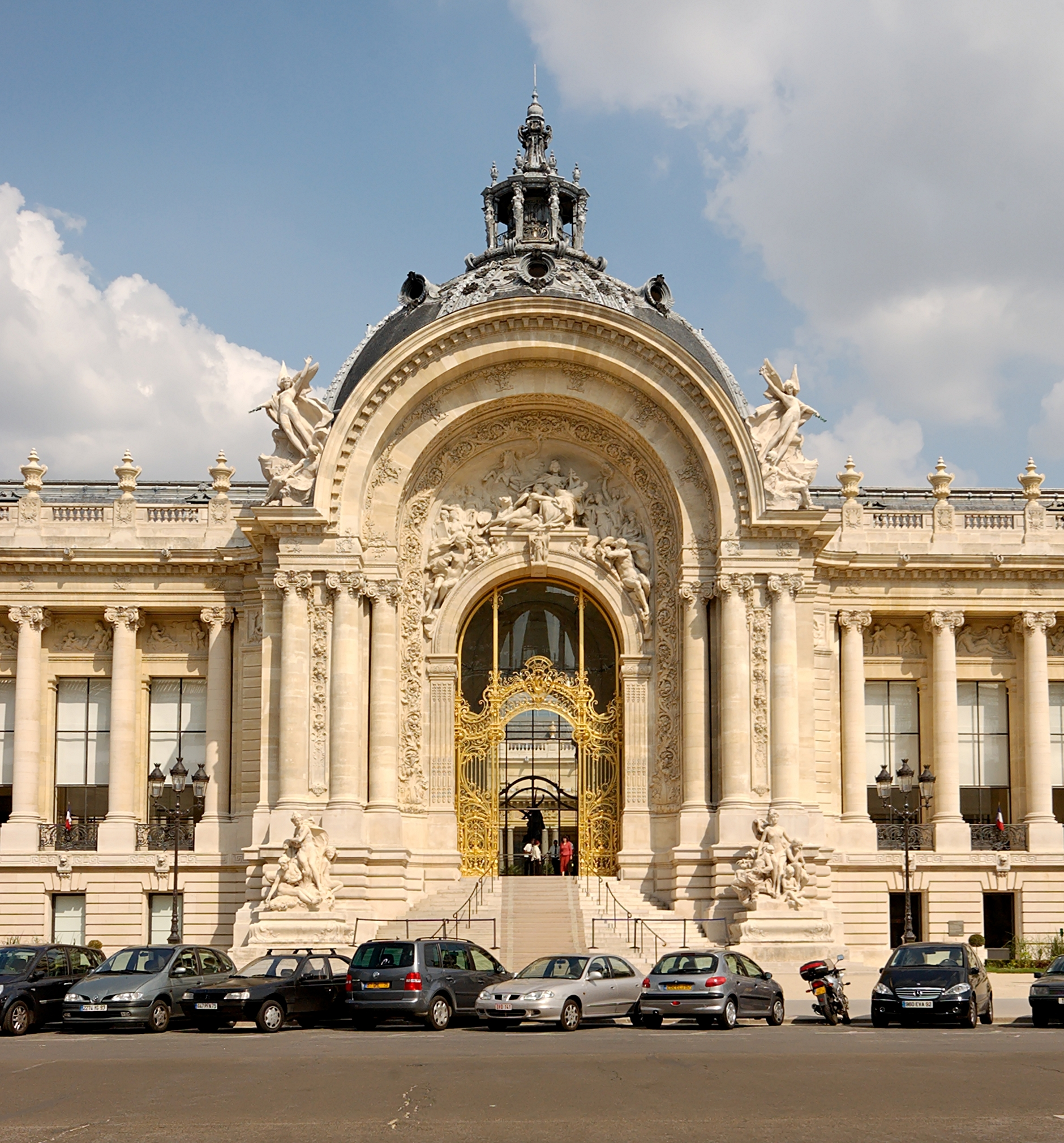
Entrance

The main façade of the building faces the Grand Palais. The focal point of the façade is the central entrance: "a central archway set in an archivolt topped by a dome and reached by a broad set of steps". Two wings flank the main entrance. These wings, continuing to the end (corner) pavilions, are embellished with free-standing columns that frame the tall windows.

==== Pavilions ====
The exterior of the pavilions are embellished with arched windows from the side around to the rear façades. These grand windows provide side lighting for the outer three galleries of the interior museum.

==== Decoration ====
The exterior of the Petit Palais was embellished with many contemporary sculptures. Several famous sculptors at the time, such as Louis Convers, Charles Desvergnes, Léon Fagel, Desiré Maurice Ferrary, Jean-Baptiste Hugues, Jean Antoine Injalbert and Émile Peynot, worked on the exterior decoration of the building.

=== Interior ===
==== Courtyard ====
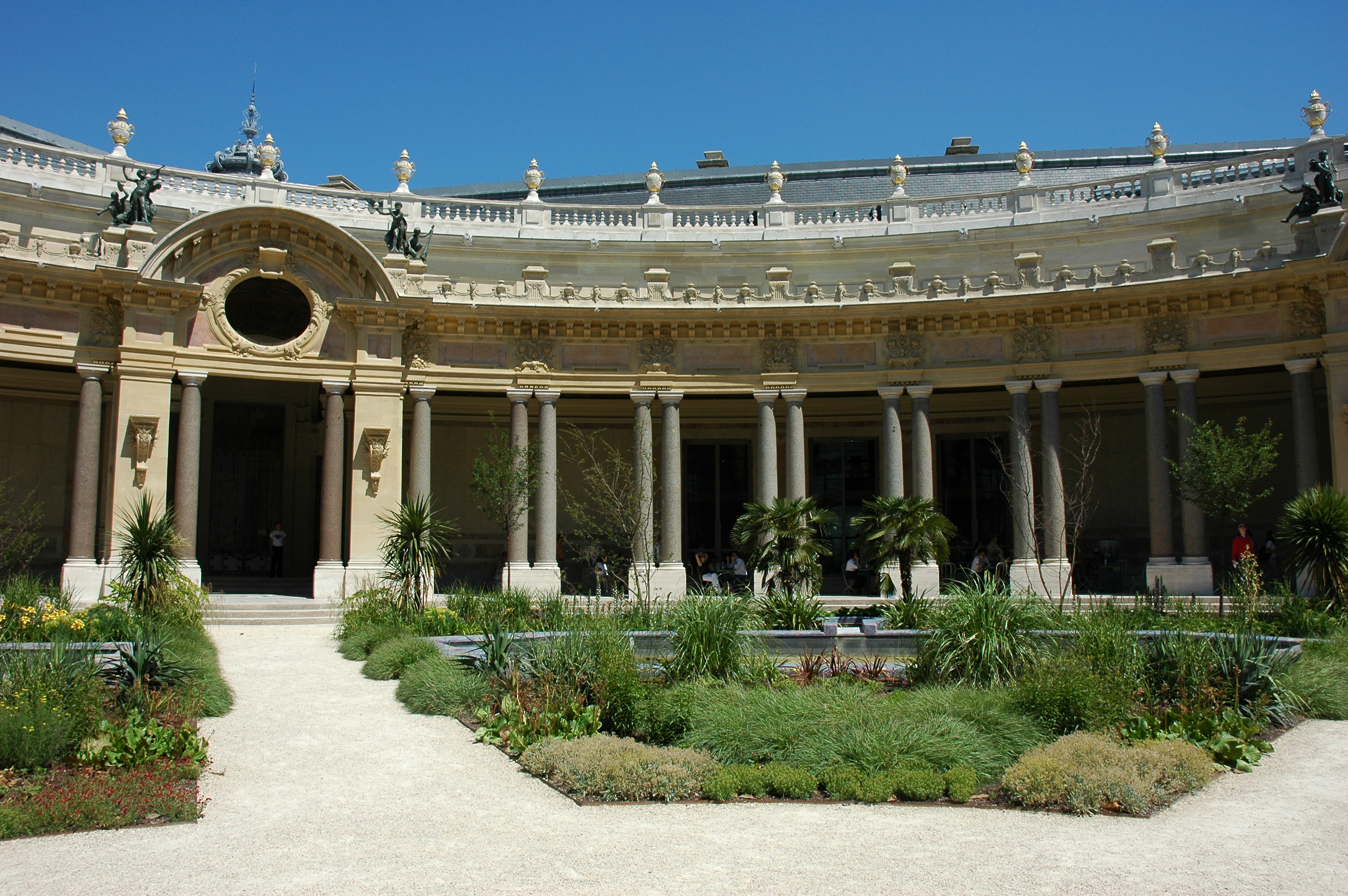
View of the garden

The trapezoidal shape of the Petit Palais forms an open area at the centre of the building. This enclosed area creates a semicircular, peristyled courtyard. The architecture of the courtyard incorporated many different architectural elements. The elegant courtyard is considered Beaux-Arts style because of the "symmetrical composition" and "rich decoration in high relief". Coupled columns made of pink Vosges granite and gilt-bronze encircle the courtyard and bordering covered gallery. Although the courtyard is in the central part of the Petit Palais, one of the main structures of the Exhibition, its purpose was to provide visitors with a relaxing space apart from the busy Exposition.

==== Museum ====
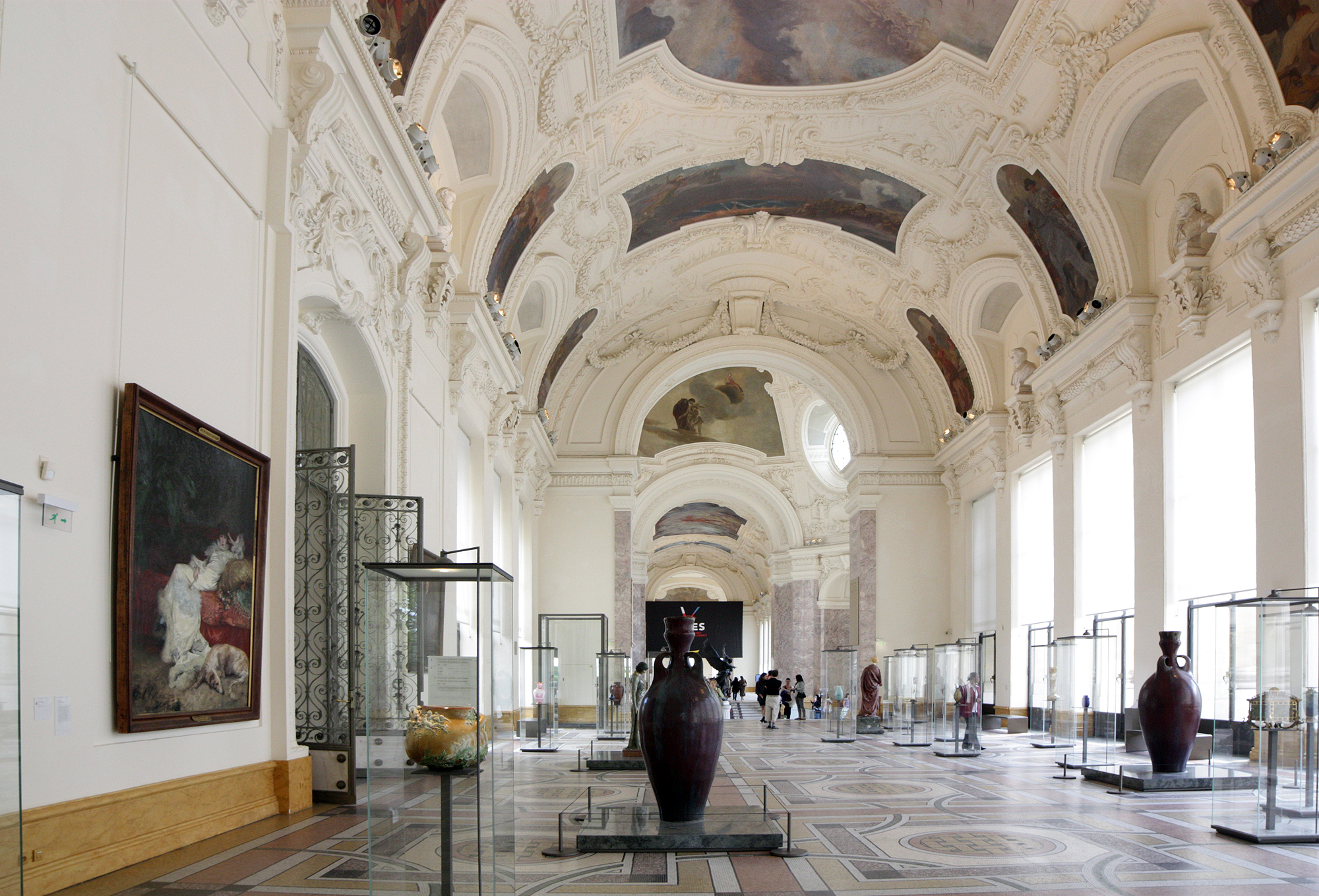
Petit Palais interior

The museum is split into two levels with two series of rooms running parallel and juxtaposed. The interior of the Petit Palais was designed to create exhibition spaces "suited to every aspect of a collection: the outer galleries for objects, the inner, skylit ones for paintings, the lower galleries for reserves and the entrance rotunda and main gallery for sculptures". The entrance rotunda and main gallery was especially grand. The floors were tiled with mosaics, the walls were lined with marble, whereas the dome and vaults were filled with allegorical paintings.

== Exhibits ==
The exhibits housed in the Petit Palais during the Exhibition displayed the History of Art from the beginning until the present era. The History of French Art from 1800–1900 showed the stages of growth. The inner gallery of Petit Palais exhibited "priceless treasures in ivory, tapestry, metal work, jewelry, and porcelain gathered from the most important collections of France". The outer gallery was a collection of royal French furniture.

The exhibits are divided into sections: the Dutuit Collection of medieval and Renaissance paintings, drawings and objets d'art; the Tuck Collection of 18th century furniture and the City of Paris collection of paintings. The museum displays paintings by painters such as Rembrandt, Rubens, Nicolas Poussin, Claude Gellée, Fragonard, Hubert Robert, Greuze and a remarkable collection of 19th-century painting and sculpture: Ingres, Géricault, Delacroix, Courbet, Monet, Sisley, Pissarro, Cézanne, Danger, Modigliani, Carpeaux, Maillol and Rodin, among others. There is also a relatively small but important collection of ancient Greek and Roman art and of Christian icons for which the museums's first and only 21st-century artwork was acquired in 2019 (Les Martyrs de Libye by Nikola Sarić).

== Reactions and influence abroad ==
As a whole, the architecture of the 1900 Exhibition was not well received, but reactions to the Petit Palais were generally positive. Some people even claimed that the Petit Palais had the "power to educate the mind while it pleases the senses". King Leopold II of Belgium was very impressed with Girault's execution of the Petit Palais. This admiration started a "fruitful collaboration between monarch and architect". Girault was commissioned to build several structures including: the Arc du Cinquantenaire in Brussels, extensions at the Royal Castle of Laeken, and a seafront colonnade at Ostend. The Petit Palais has served as a model for other public buildings, notably for the Royal Museum for Central Africa located in Tervuren, Belgium; and the Chilean National Museum of Fine Arts in Santiago.

== Gallery ==
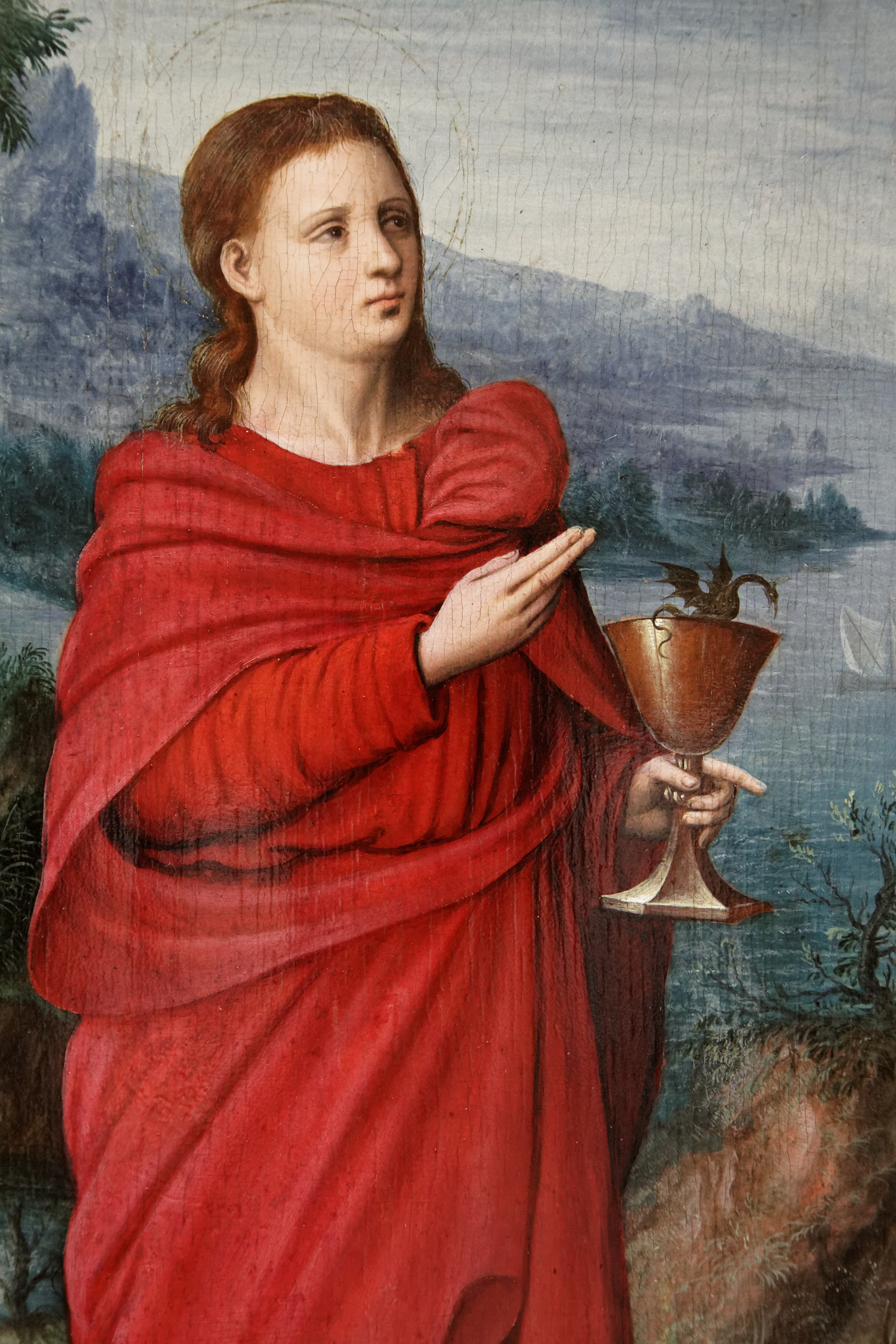
John the Apostle, detail of a 16th-century painting

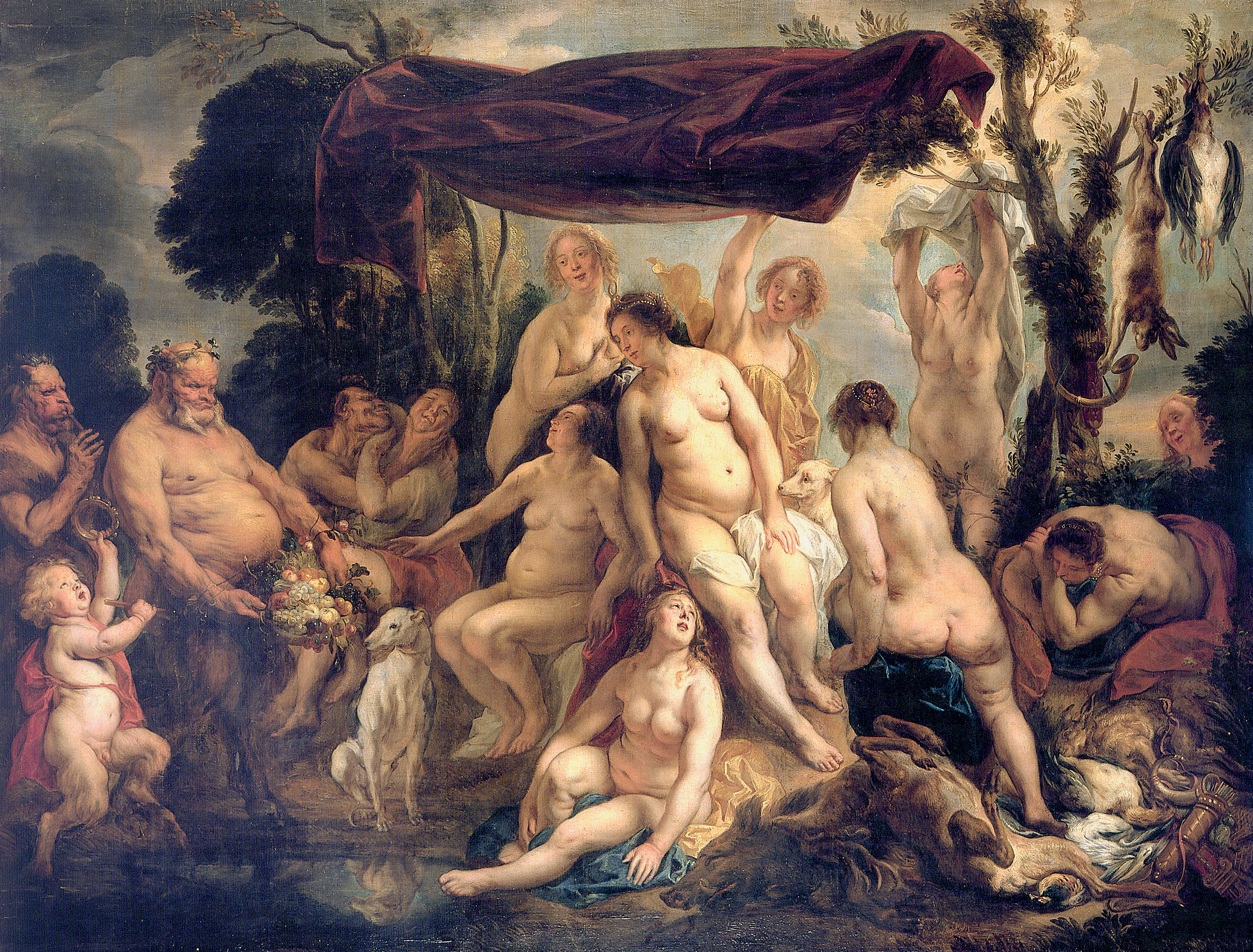
Diana Resting, by Jacob Jordaens

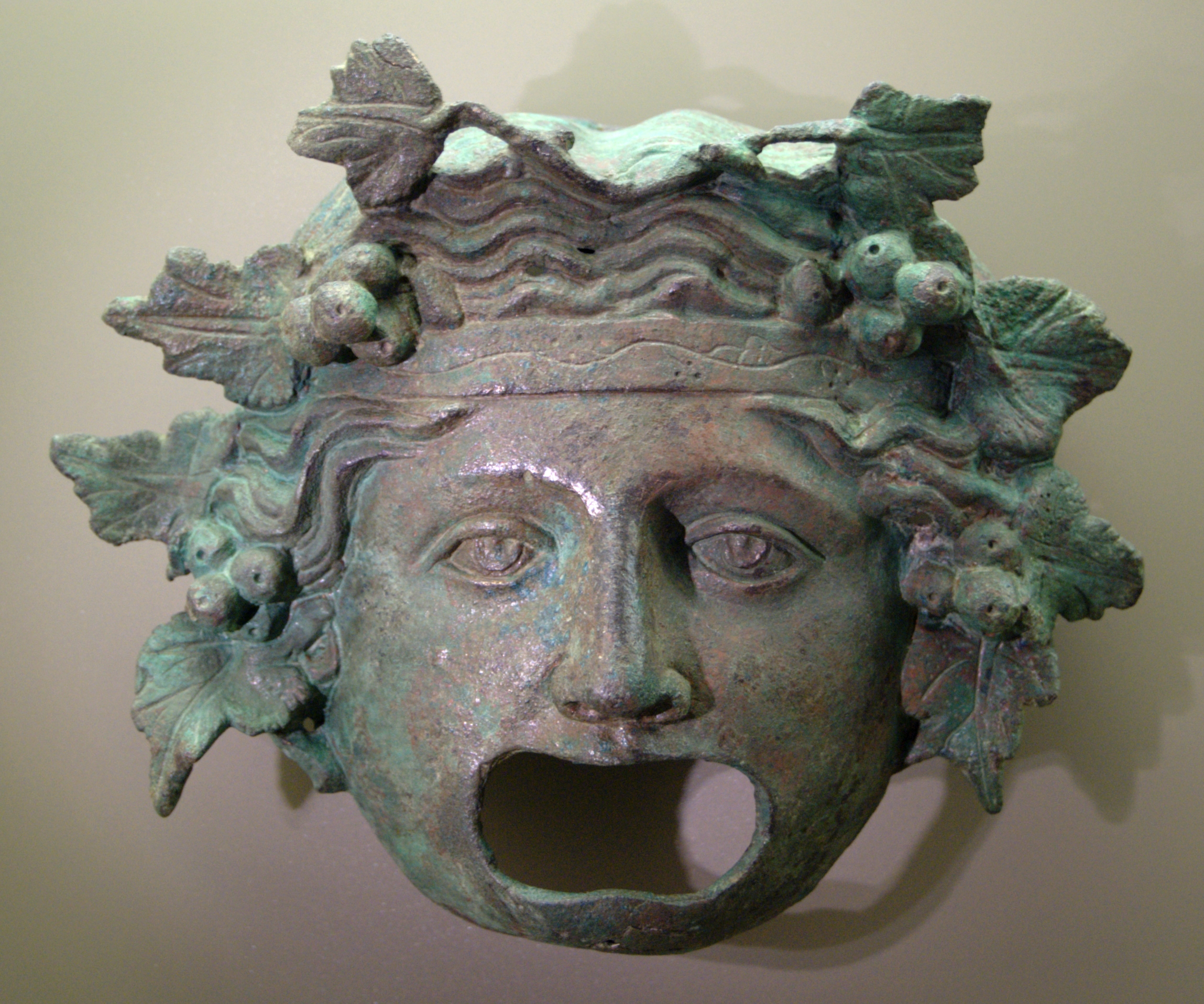
Mask of Dionysos Tauros

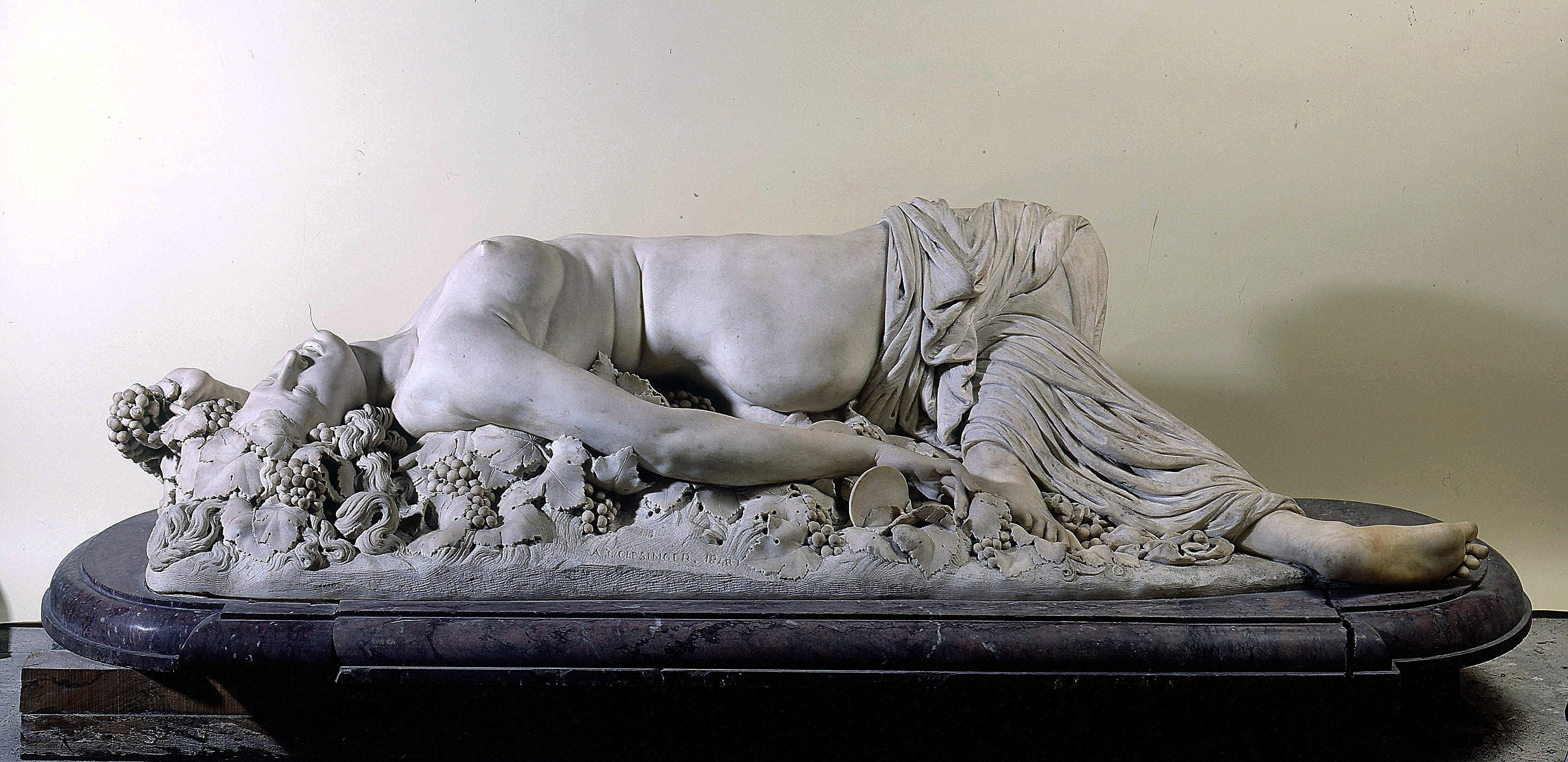
Woman stung by a snake by Auguste Clésinger

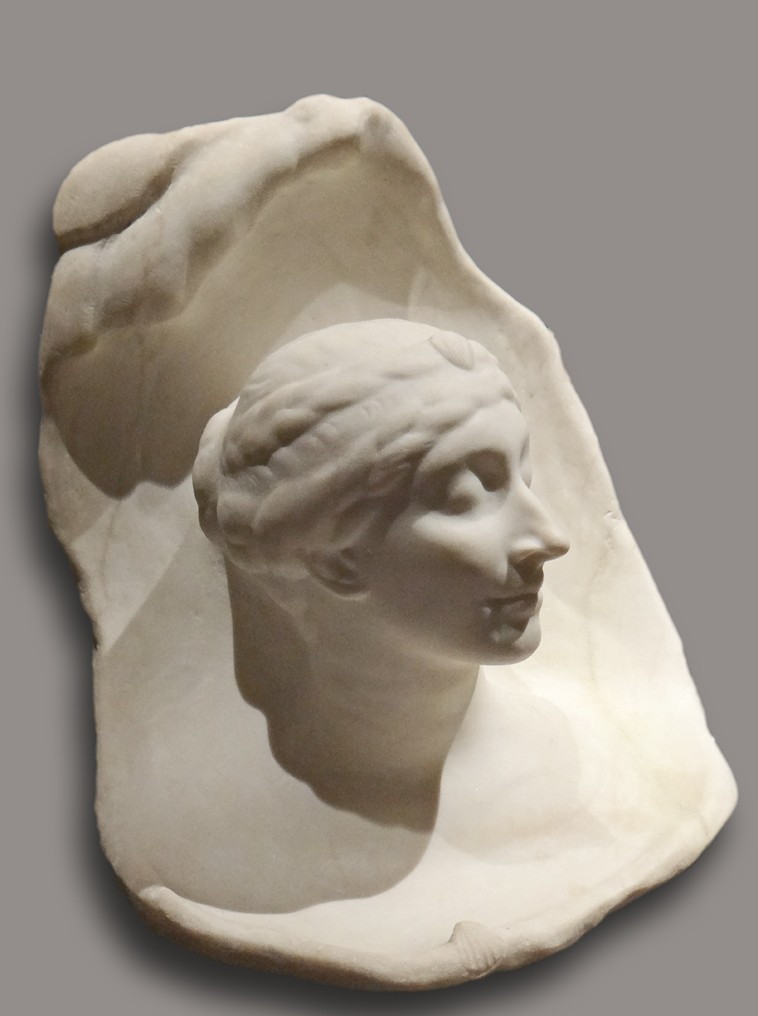
La naissance d'Aphrodite by Antoine Bourdelle

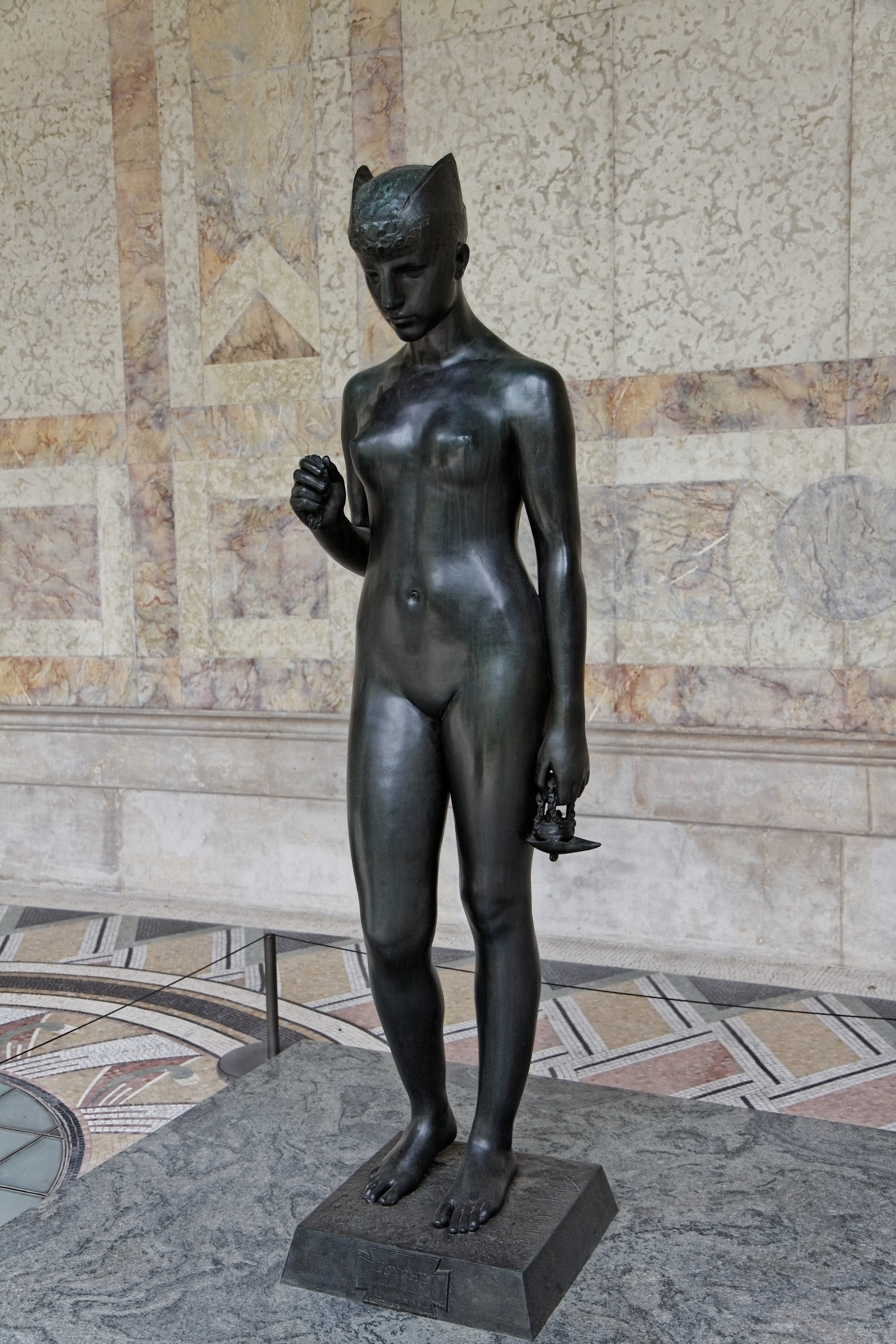
Psyché sous l'empire du mystère, by Hélène Bertaux

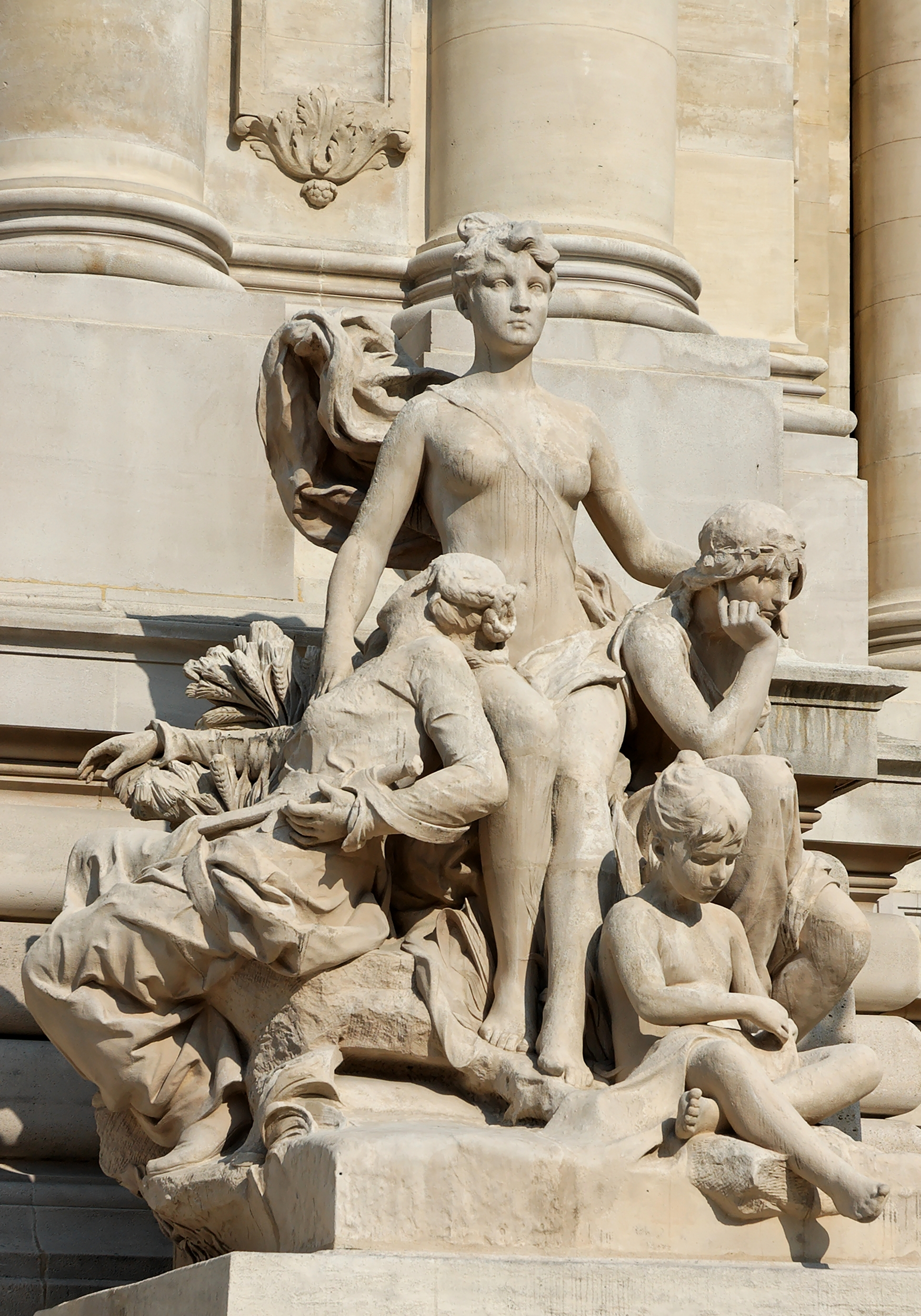
The Seine and its tributaries by Désiré-Maurice Ferrary

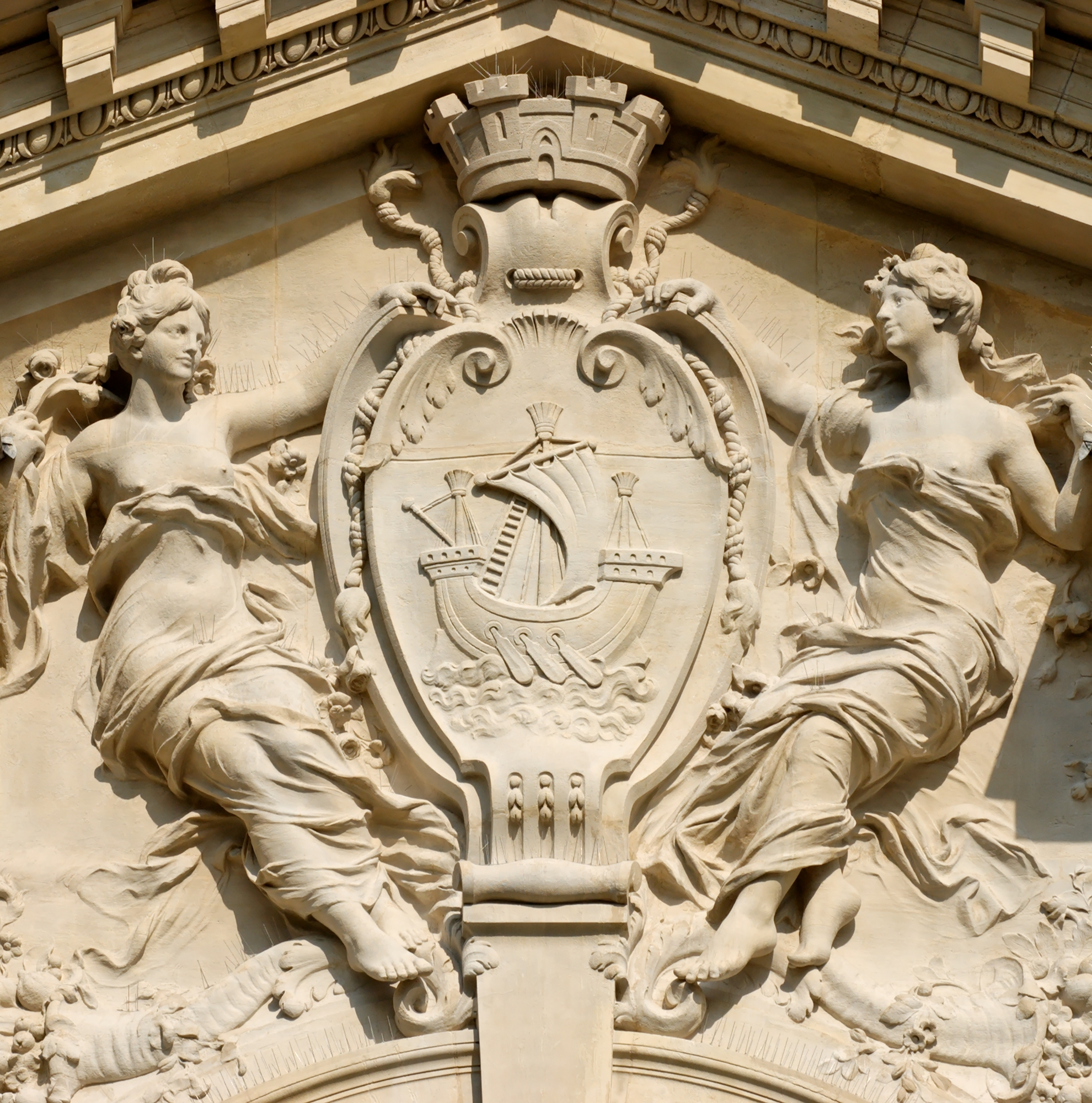
Coat of Arms of Paris by Émile Peynot

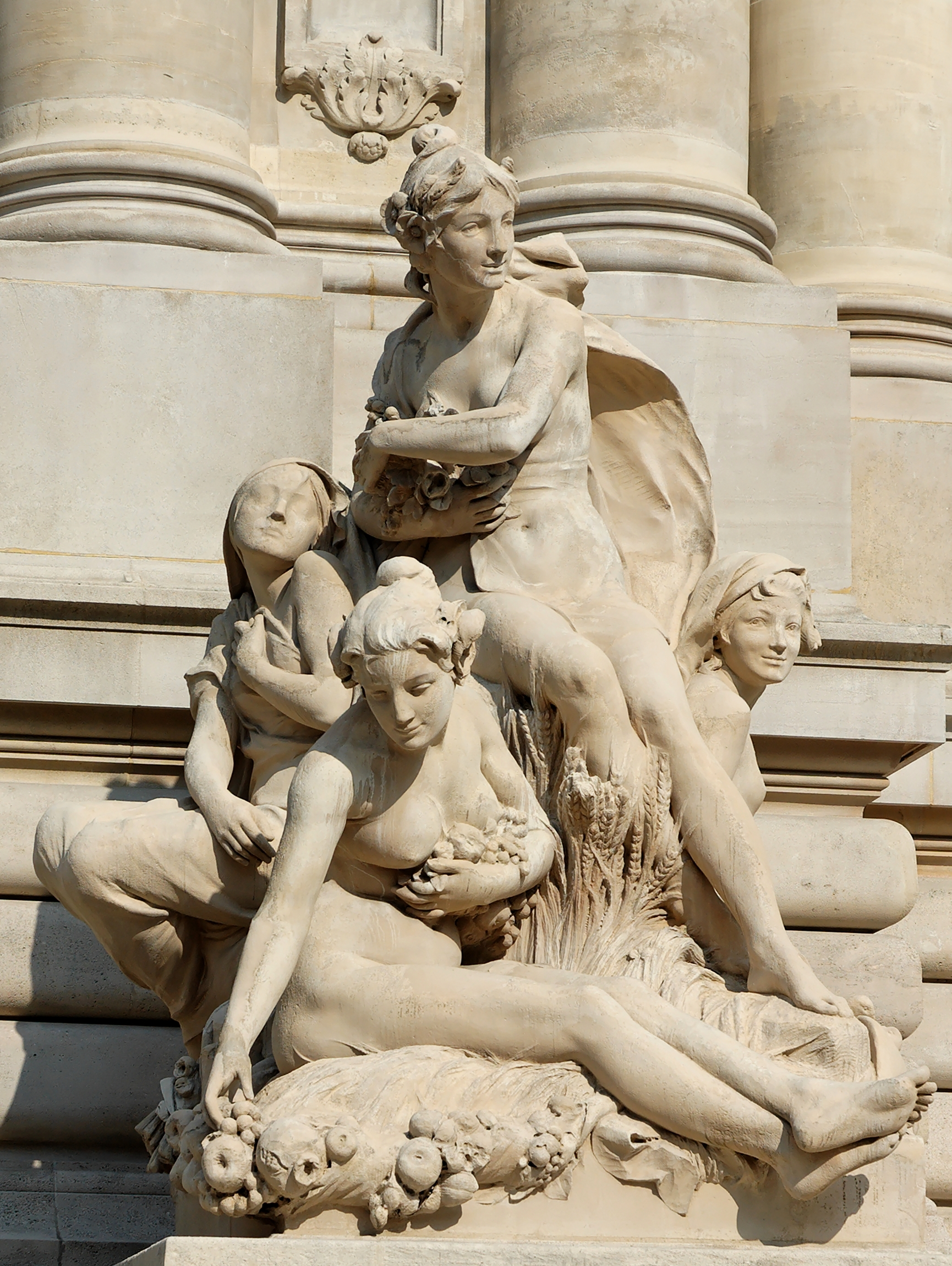
Quatre saisons by Louis Convers

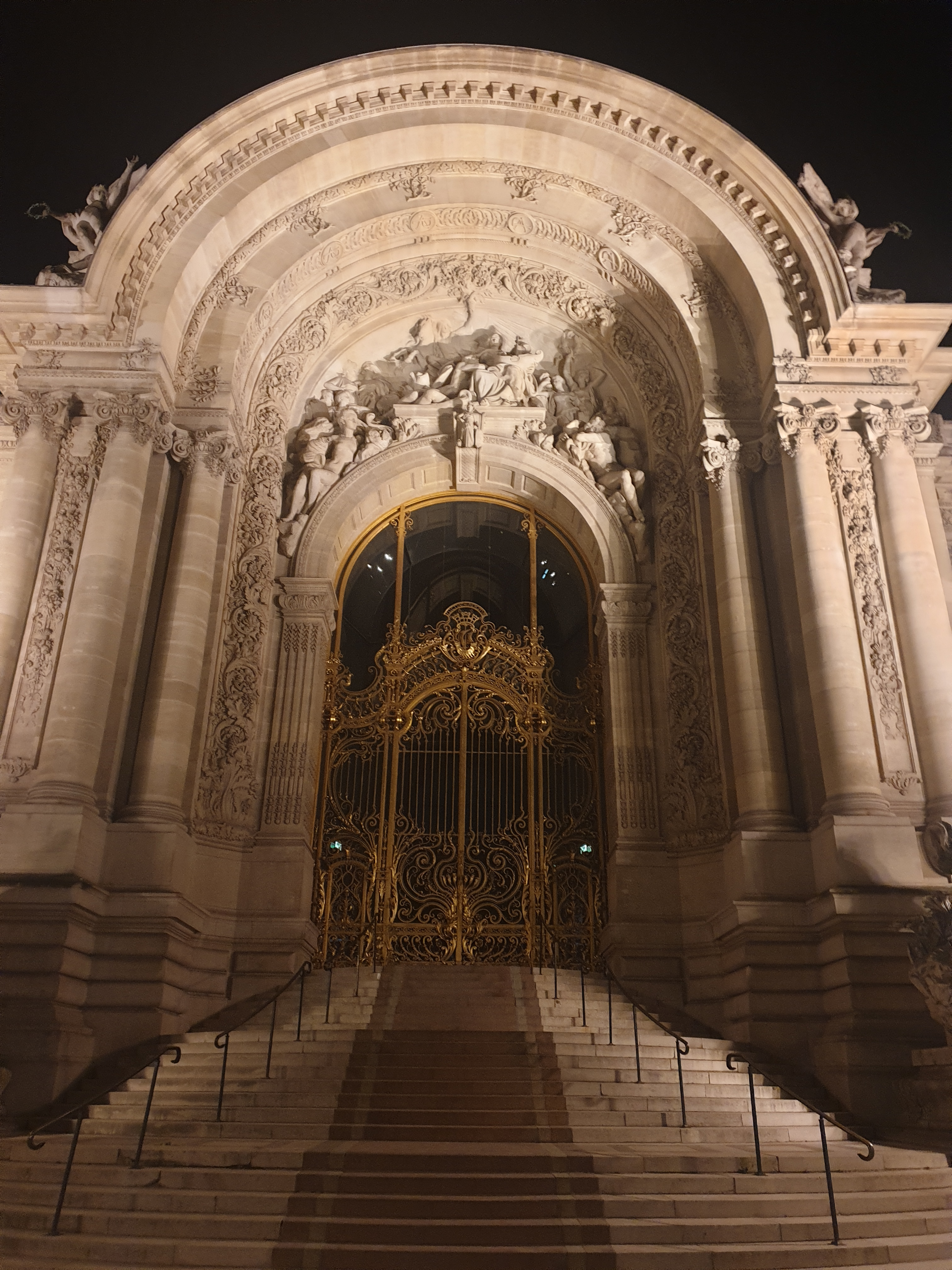
Entrance of the Petit Palais by night in 2022

== See also ==
- List of museums in Paris
- List of largest art museums
- List of works by Henri Chapu
- The works of Paul Dubois- French sculptor
