= Mont Sainte-Victoire and the Viaduct of the Arc River Valley =

Painting by Paul Cézanne

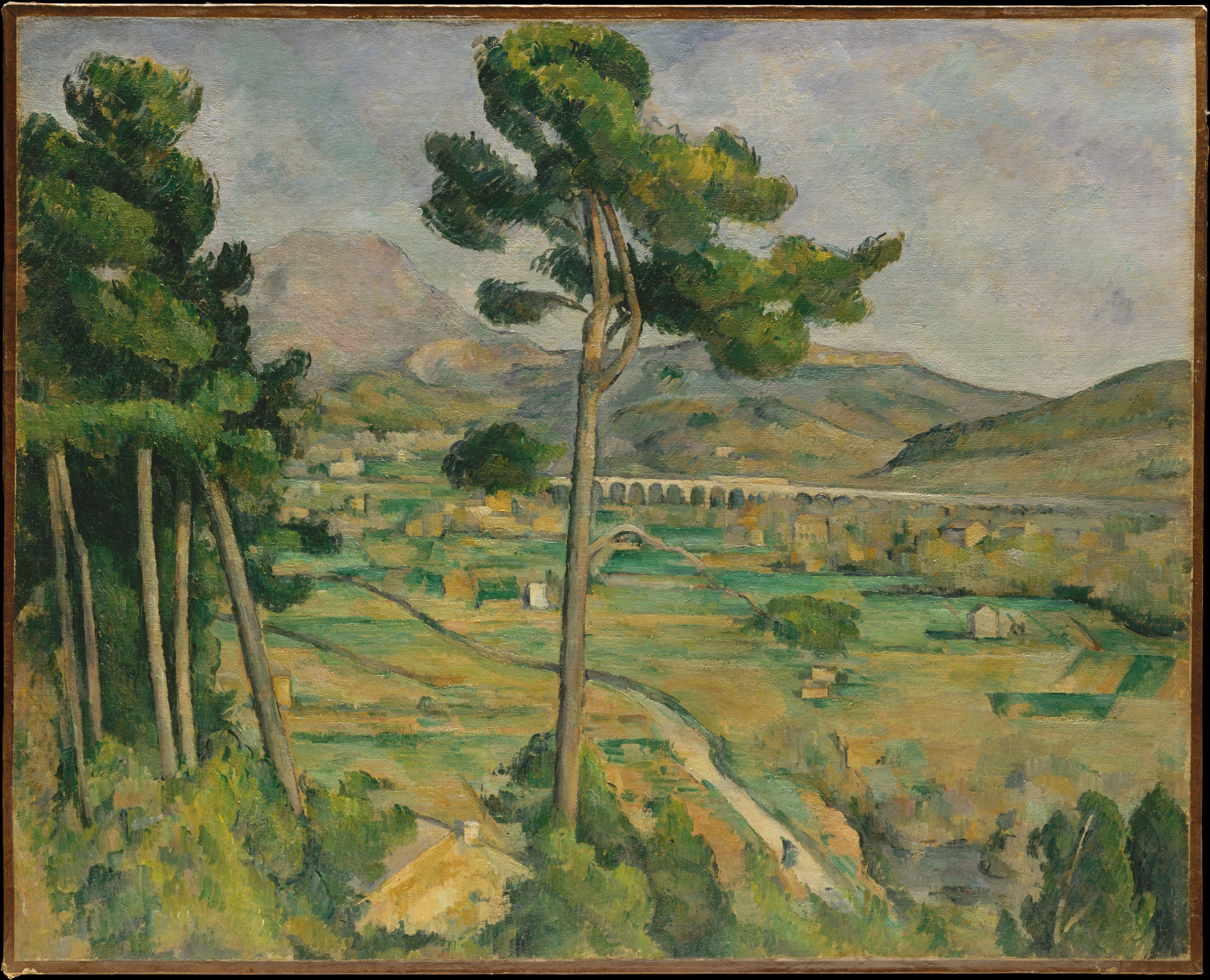
- Artist: Paul Cézanne
- Year: 1882–1885
- Medium: Oil-on-canvas
- Dimensions: 65.5 cm × 81.7 cm (25.8 in × 32.2 in)
- Location: Metropolitan Museum of Art, New York

Mont Sainte-Victoire and the Viaduct of the Arc River Valley is an oil painting on canvas completed by the French artist Paul Cézanne between 1882 and 1885. It depicts Montagne Sainte-Victoire and the valley of the Arc River, with Cézanne's hometown of Aix-en-Provence in the background. Once owned by the art collectors and patrons Henry and Louisine Havemeyer, the painting was bequeathed to the Metropolitan Museum of Art in New York after the latter's death in 1929.

== Background ==
The Mont Sainte-Victoire and the Viaduct of the Arc River Valley was painted from 1882 to 1885, and was completed 21 years before Cézanne's artistic career finished. Cézanne began working on Impressionism in his artworks in the late 19th century, nearing the end of his career, away from his post-impressionist former paintings. A later example of this can be seen in The Card Players. These mainly included still lifes and landscapes such as Mont Sainte-Victoire and the Viaduct of the Arc River Valley. His aim was "to make of Impressionism something solid and durable, like the art of museums." It was painted in the 'mature' period of Cézanne's work.

The Mont Sainte-Victoire and the Viaduct of the Arc River Valley was a bequest to the Metropolitan Museum of Art by Henry Osborne Havemeyer and his wife Louisine Waldron Elder Havemeyer. After Henry died in 1907, the work passed to Louisine; it was donated to the museum following her death in 1929 as part of the Havemeyer collection of 142 artworks.

== Description ==
The painting depicts the Montagne Sainte-Victoire, which dominates the landscape of his native city of Aix-en-Provence (southern France). The city is visible in the distance, far back from the valley of the Arc River.

Only half a year after the opening of the Aix–Marseille railway line on October 15, 1877, Cézanne wrote to his friend Émile Zola on April 14, 1878, praising Mont Sainte-Victoire—seen from the train as it crossed the Arc River Valley bridge—as a “beau motif” (“beautiful motif”). Around this time, at the age of thirty-nine, Cézanne began, for the first time, a series of paintings devoted to Mont Sainte-Victoire in his native Aix-en-Provence. It is therefore highly probable that this celebrated series was inspired by the scenery viewed from the window of a moving train.

Indeed, in this painting, the railway bridge on the Aix–Marseille line, which crosses the Arc River Valley, is depicted near the center-right of the composition.

It is 65.5 cm × 81.7 cm (25.8 in × 32.2 in) in size, one of Cézanne's smallest works in his artistic career. Cézanne depicted the same mountain several other times, including in Mont Sainte-Victoire seen from Bellevue, in Mont Sainte-Victoire with Large Pine, in Plain by Mont Sainte-Victoire, and in paintings titled simply Mont Sainte-Victoire in the holdings of the Courtauld Institute of Art in London and the National Gallery of Scotland in Edinburgh. Mont Sainte-Victoire and the Viaduct of the Arc River Valley was painted near the end of his working career.

In this painting, Cézanne explores the creation of depth using layers to build up a set of horizontal planes that draw the eye into the view. In 1989, this work was described as one of Cézanne's greatest.

== See also ==
- List of paintings by Paul Cézanne
- Tomoki Akimaru, "Cézanne and the Railway (1) – (7)", Art Critique+, AICA (Association Internationale des Critiques d'Art) Japan, 21 April 2025.
