= Henry Pearlman =

American art collector (1895–1974)

- Pearlman in his office at Eastern Cold Storage in New York, NY, with paintings by Modigliani and Manet in the background
- Born: 1895; Brooklyn, NY
- Died: 1974 (aged 78–79)
- Occupations: Founder and CEO of Eastern Cold Storage
- Known for: Art collector

Henry Pearlman (1895–1974) was a Brooklyn-born, self-made businessman, and collector of Impressionist and Post-Impressionist art. Over three postwar decades, he assembled a "deeply personal" and much revered collection centered on thirty-three works by Paul Cézanne and more than forty by Vincent van Gogh, Amedeo Modigliani, Chaïm Soutine, Paul Gauguin, Édouard Manet, Henri de Toulouse-Lautrec and a dozen other European modernists.

== Early life and business career ==
Pearlman started his career in the cork insulation business, forming his own company, Eastern Cold Storage Insulation Corporation, at the age of twenty-four and becoming a major player in marine refrigeration. He married Rose Fried in 1925. They raised two daughters in Croton-on-Hudson, eventually living both there and in Manhattan and traveling frequently in pursuit of art.

== Art collector ==
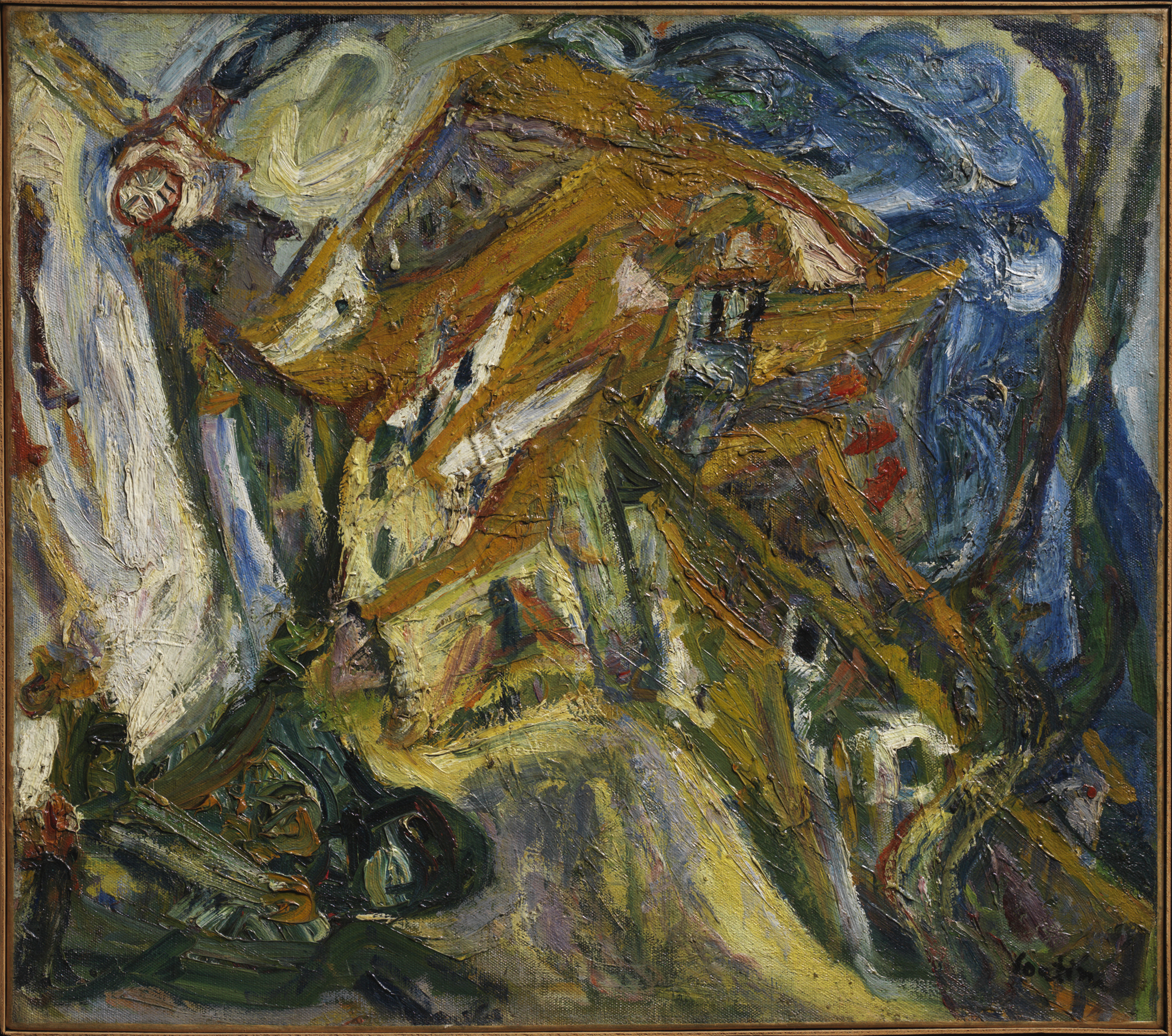
Chaïm Soutine, View of Céret, ca. 1921-22

While Pearlman initially decorated his Croton home with Old Master and American Realist paintings, including those found at local flea markets, he later turned to expressionist paintings. In 1945, he purchased an expressionist painting by Chaïm Soutine – View of Céret (formerly Village Square, Céret). Pearlman quickly made connections in the New York art world and traded his decorative collection for carefully selected examples of modern works by impressionist, post-impressionist and expressionist European artists.

In the years after World War II, Pearlman began traveling to Europe. During an early trip to London he met Austrian expressionist Oskar Kokoschka. This would result in a lifelong friendship for Pearlman with one of the few living artists whose work he collected. On this same trip he also visited the places where Soutine had painted. Ultimately, Pearlman's collection would include seven paintings by Soutine, and four works by Modigliani, including a rare limestone head and two oil portraits (Léon Indenbaum and Jean Cocteau).

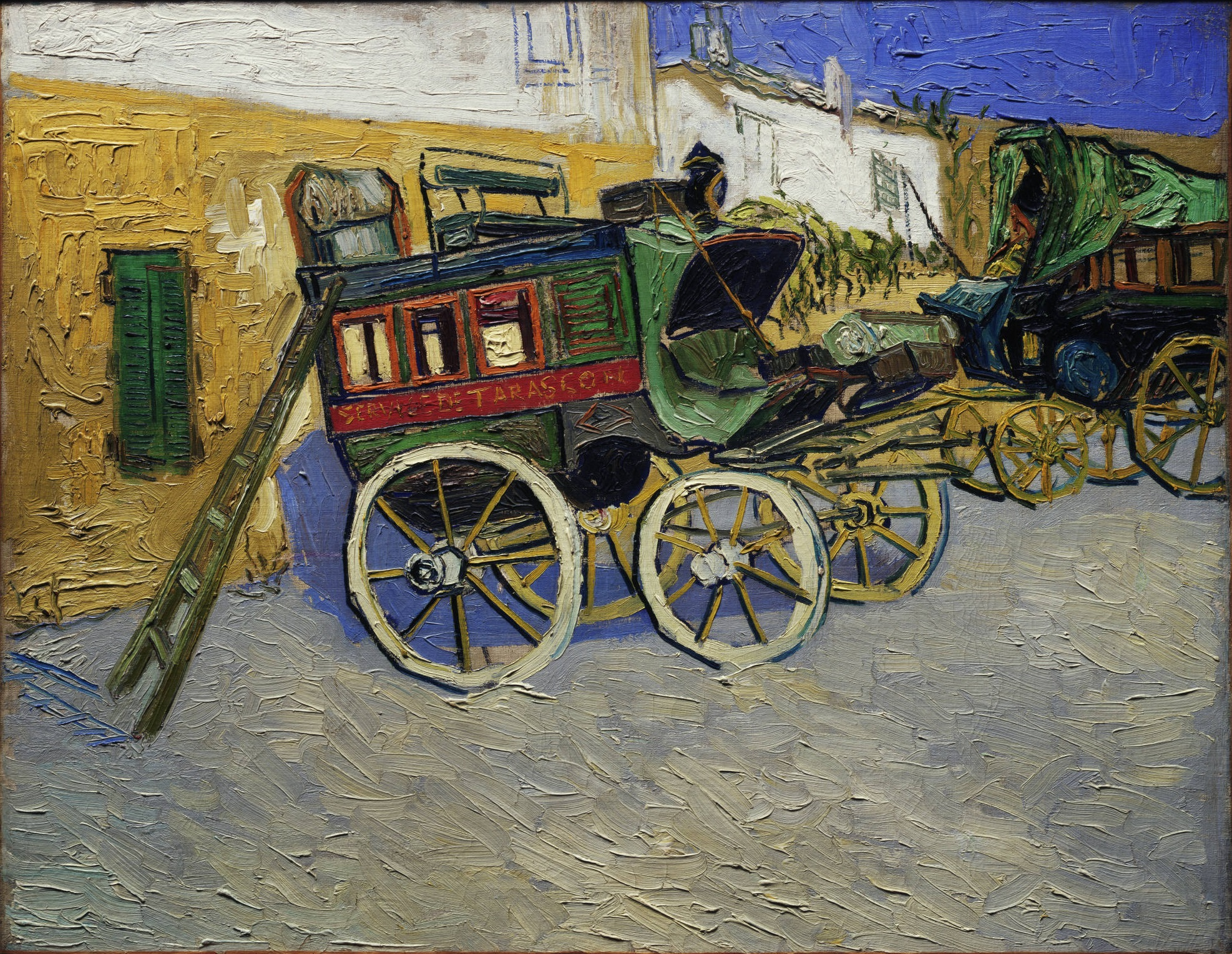
Vincent Van Gogh, Tarascon Stagecoach, 1888. Collection of the Henry and Rose Pearlman Foundation.

Although successful in business, Pearlman was never able to match the resources of his contemporaries. Instead, "he was both lucky and clever: lucky in that, when he first started, the art he was interested in…could be secured for thousands rather than millions of dollars…and clever in that he continuously honed his eye and then applied his skills… to obtain the objects of his passion." In 1950, Pearlman learned from a dealer that Van Gogh’s Tarascon Diligence was available from the heirs of the artist Milo Beretta. He offered a combination of paintings and cash to acquire the long lost painting, the last time. Also in 1950, with the advice of noted Cézanne specialist John Rewald, Pearlman made his first purchase of a Cézanne watercolor, Cistern in the Park of Château Noir. Over the following two decades, he acquired more than thirty works by Cézanne and assemble a distinguished collection of watercolors by the artist.

In addition to Modigliani, he added works by Toulouse-Lautrec, Manet, Degas, Renoir and Gauguin as well as several significant oil paintings by Cézanne, including the only known vertical-format of the artist’s favorite subject, Mont Sainte-Victoire. Pearlman continued to build his collection for the three remaining decades of his life. His last two purchases were Cézanne watercolors: a late masterpiece (Still Life with Carafe, Bottle, and Fruit) and Rocks at Bibémus.

== Exhibitions and legacy ==
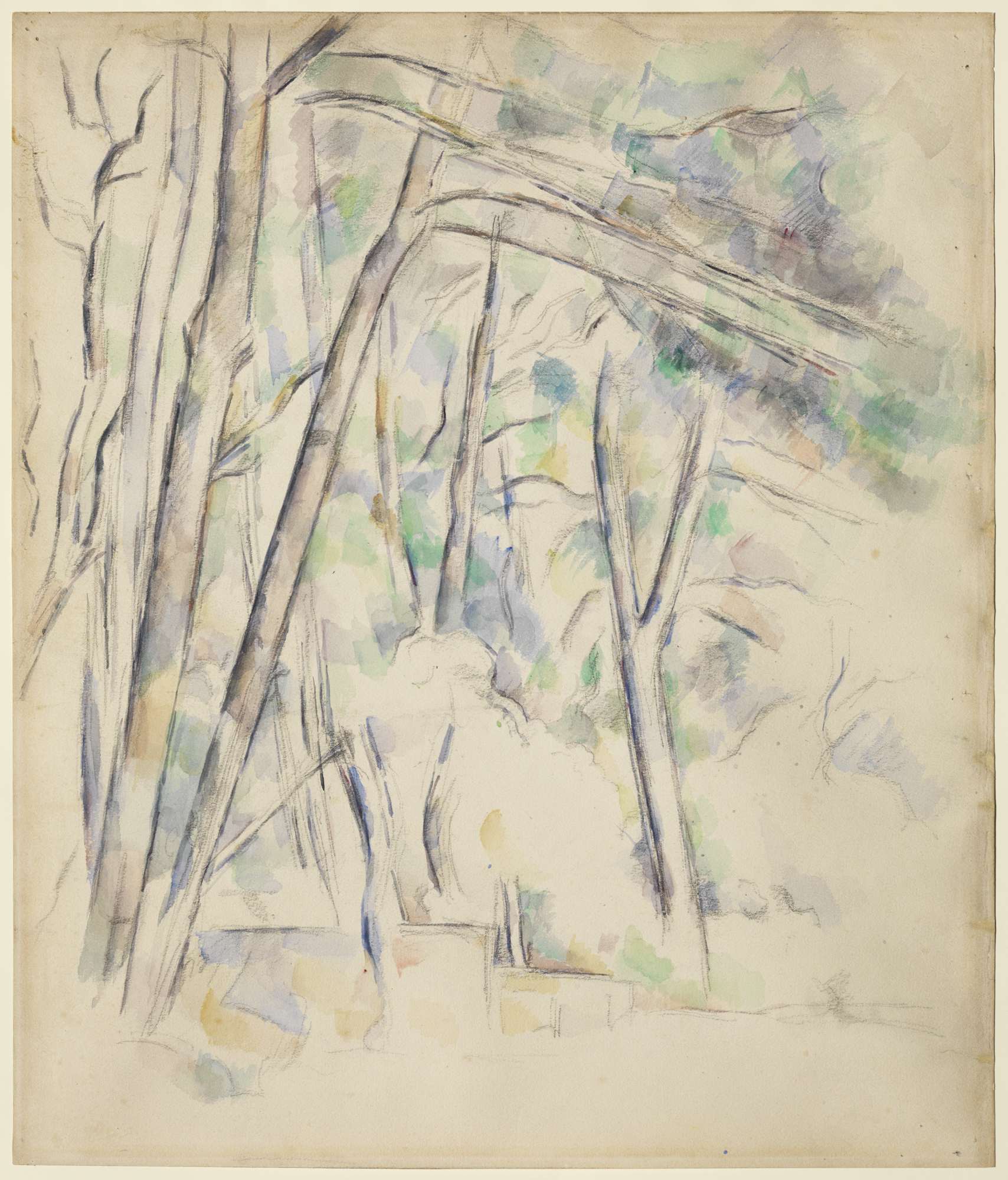
Paul Cézanne, Cistern in the Park of Château Noir, 1895-1900

Beginning in the 1950s, Henry and Rose Pearlman began lending individual works to major museums, initially for retrospectives of Soutine and Modigliani. Pearlman also lent financial and other support to artists, including Kokoschka and Jacques Lipchitz, whose studio was destroyed by fire in 1952. Later he allowed his collection to be exhibited as a fundraiser for an organization helping immigrant populations settle in New York.

The Henry and Rose Pearlman Foundation was established in 1955 as a not-for-profit organization and is the current owner of the collection. The first exhibition of the collection took place in 1958, when twenty-seven selected works were lent anonymously to the Baltimore Museum of Art. Numerous exhibitions of the collection (in whole and in part) have taken place over the past six decades, including the following: forty-six works were shown at Knoedler & Company in New York in 1959; the Fogg Museum in 1959; the collection was featured in different exhibitions at the Brooklyn Museum of Art in 1960, 1964, 1974 and 1986; the Detroit Institute of Art in 1967; the Wadsworth Atheneum in 1970; the National Gallery of Art in 1972, and at the Fine Arts Museums of San Francisco in 1982. In 1961 Pearlman began making summer loans to museums, starting with the Metropolitan Museum of Art’s "Paintings from Private Collections: Summer Loan Exhibition" series, in part so that the works would be safe and seen while he and Rose were in Croton.

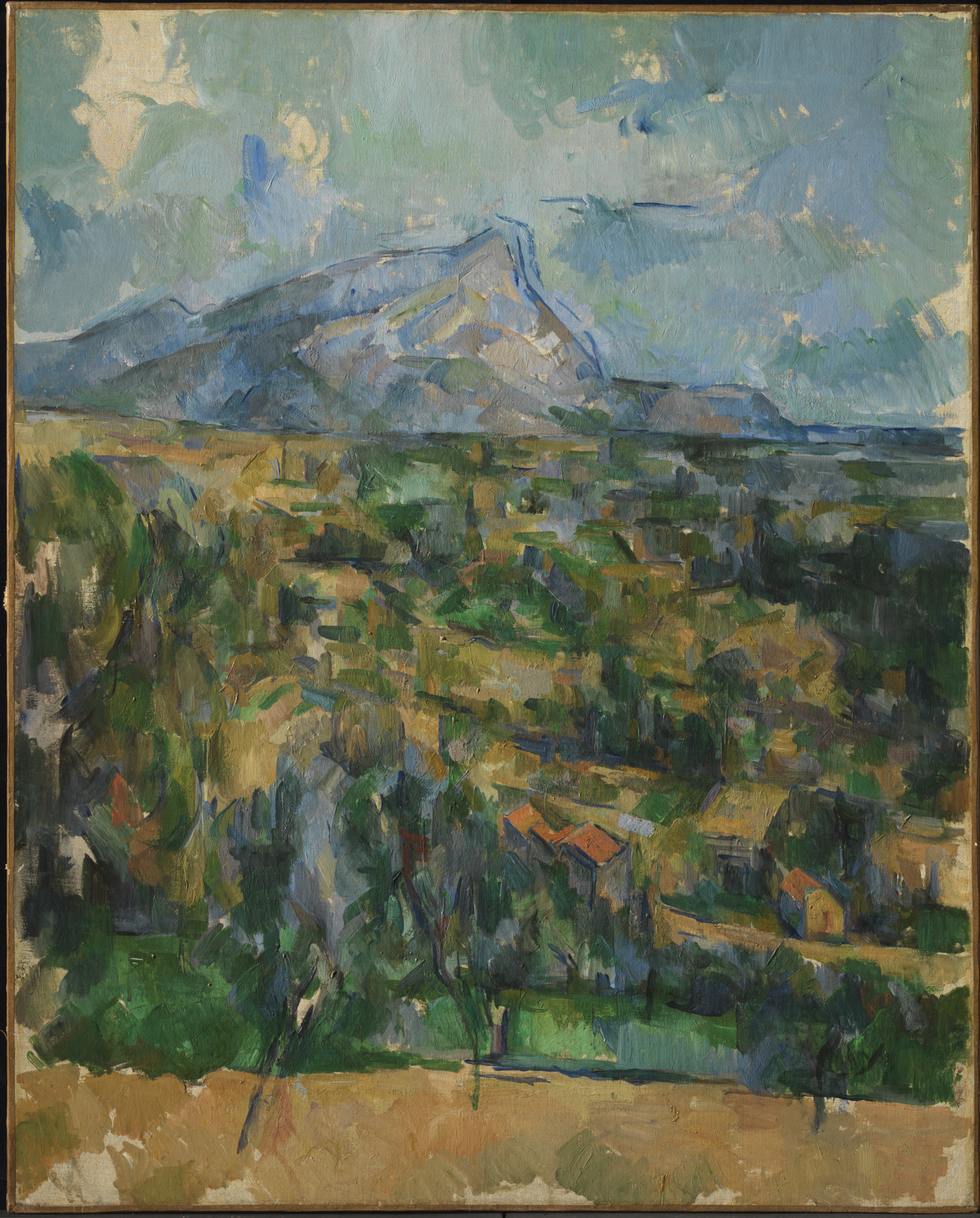
Paul Cézanne, Mont Sainte-Victoire, ca. 1904-6

Henry Pearlman spent much of the last year of his life organizing an exhibition of the collection at the Brooklyn Museum, which toured after his death to Princeton, Utica (NY), Williamstown (MA) and the Carnegie Institute in Pittsburgh. The collection returned to the Princeton University Art Museum in 1976, when Rose Pearlman, as head of the foundation, initiated a series of longer-term loans that continue to this day. A world-class university-based museum, Princeton offers the collection security, conservation, curatorial expertise and management of loan requests from museums around the world.

In 2014, the Henry and Rose Pearlman Foundation and the Princeton University Art Museum initiated a tour of the collection, including its first exhibitions outside the United States. With the aim of expanding the audience for these works and artists, the tour (Cézanne and the Modern: Masterpieces from the Henry and Rose Pearlman Collection) opened at the Ashmolean Museum in Oxford, England, in March 2014, to critical acclaim. In July 2014, it traveled to the Musée Granet in Aix-en-Provence, France, where many of the Cézanne works were originally created. The collection then returned to North America with three exhibitions: The High Museum in Atlanta, the Vancouver Art Gallery and at Princeton for the fall semester of 2015.

== Bibliography ==
=== Primary Sources ===
Archives of American Art, Smithsonian Institution, Washington, D.C., Henry and Rose Pearlman papers, 1893-1995 (bulk 1950-1980).

The Brooklyn Museum Libraries and Archives, Records, Exhibition negatives: installations. 38 Post-Impressionist Works from the Collection of Mr. and Mrs. Henry Pearlman.1964.

The Brooklyn Museum Libraries and Archives, Records, Records, Exhibition views: installations. Paintings, Watercolors, Sculpture and Drawings from the Collection of Mr. and Mrs. Henry Pearlman. 1974.

Henry Pearlman. Reminiscences of a Collector. Princeton, 1995. ISBN 9780943012209

=== Secondary Sources ===
A Loan Exhibition of Paintings, Watercolors and Sculpture from the Collection of Mr. and Mrs. Henry Pearlman for the Benefit of Greenwich House. Exh. cat. New York, 1959. Exhibition, M. Knoedler & Co., New York, 27 January–12 February 1959.

An Exhibition of 19th & 20th Century Painting and Sculpture from the Collection of Mr. and Mrs. Henry Pearlman. Exhibition, Brooklyn Museum of Art, New York, 29 June–5 September 1960. Published checklist.

An Exhibition of Paintings, Watercolors, Sculpture and Drawings from the Collection of Mr. and Mrs. Henry Pearlman and Henry and Rose Pearlman Foundation. Exh. cat. New York, 1974. Exhibition, Brooklyn Museum of Art, New York, 22 May–29 September 1974; Art Museum, Princeton University, 8 December 1974 – 14 March 1975; Munson-Williams-Proctor Institute, Utica, N.Y., 13 April–31August 1974; Francine and Sterling Clark Institute, Williamstown, Mass., 26 September 1975 – 22 February 1976; Carnegie Institute, Pittsburgh, 6 April–30 May 1976.

Anonymous. "Pearlman Collection: Taste with a Reverse Twist." Art News (February 1959), pp. 26–27, 63.

Anonymous. "The Pearlman Collection." Arts 33 (February 1959), pp. 46–47.

John Ashbery, "Cultured Pearls," New York Magazine (5 August 1974), p. 62.

A. L. Chanin. "The Henry Pearlman Collection." Connoisseur 145, no. 586 (June 1960), pp. 230–36.

Cézanne and His Contemporaries: The Mr. and Mrs. Henry Pearlman Collection. Exh. cat. Detroit, 1967. Exhibition, Detroit Institute of Arts, 14 June–1 October 1967.

Rachael Z. DeLue et al., Cézanne and the Modern: Masterpieces of European Art from the Pearlman Collection (New Haven and Princeton, 2014). ISBN 9780300174403

Laura M. Giles and Carol Armstrong, eds. Cézanne in Focus: Watercolors from the Henry and Rose Pearlman Collection. Exh. cat. Princeton, 2002. Exhibition, Princeton University Art Museum, 19 October 2002 – 12 January 2003.

Impressionism, Post-impressionism, Expressionism: The Mr. & Mrs. Henry Pearlman Collection of Works by Cézanne, Van Gogh, Degas, Toulouse Lautrec, Manet, Modigliani, Soutine, and Others. Exh. cat. Hartford, Conn., 1970. Exhibition, Wadsworth Atheneum, Hartford, Conn., 10 June–4 October 1970.

Jonathan Jones, "Cézanne and the Modern review – 'puts Ashmolean in the big league,'" The Guardian (10 March 2014).

John Russell, "In Pearlman Art Display, the Coups of a Collector," New York Times (23 May 1974).

Sixteen Watercolors by Cézanne from the Collection of Mr. and Mrs. Henry Pearlman. Exh. cat. New York, 1973. Exhibition, Paul Rosenberg & Co., New York, 16 October–16 November 1973.

Summer Loan 1971: Paintings from New York Collections: Collection of Mr. and Mrs. Henry Pearlman and The Henry and Rose Pearlman Foundation. Exhibition, The Metropolitan Museum of Art, New York, 13 July–7 September 1971. Published checklist.

Theresa Thompson, "A collection of truly stunning art works," The Oxford Times (20 March 2014).

Jackie Wullschlager, "Cézanne and modern masterpieces from the Pearlman Collection," Financial Times (14 March 2014).
