= Cross of Provence =

Coordinates: 43°31′51″N 5°34′49″E

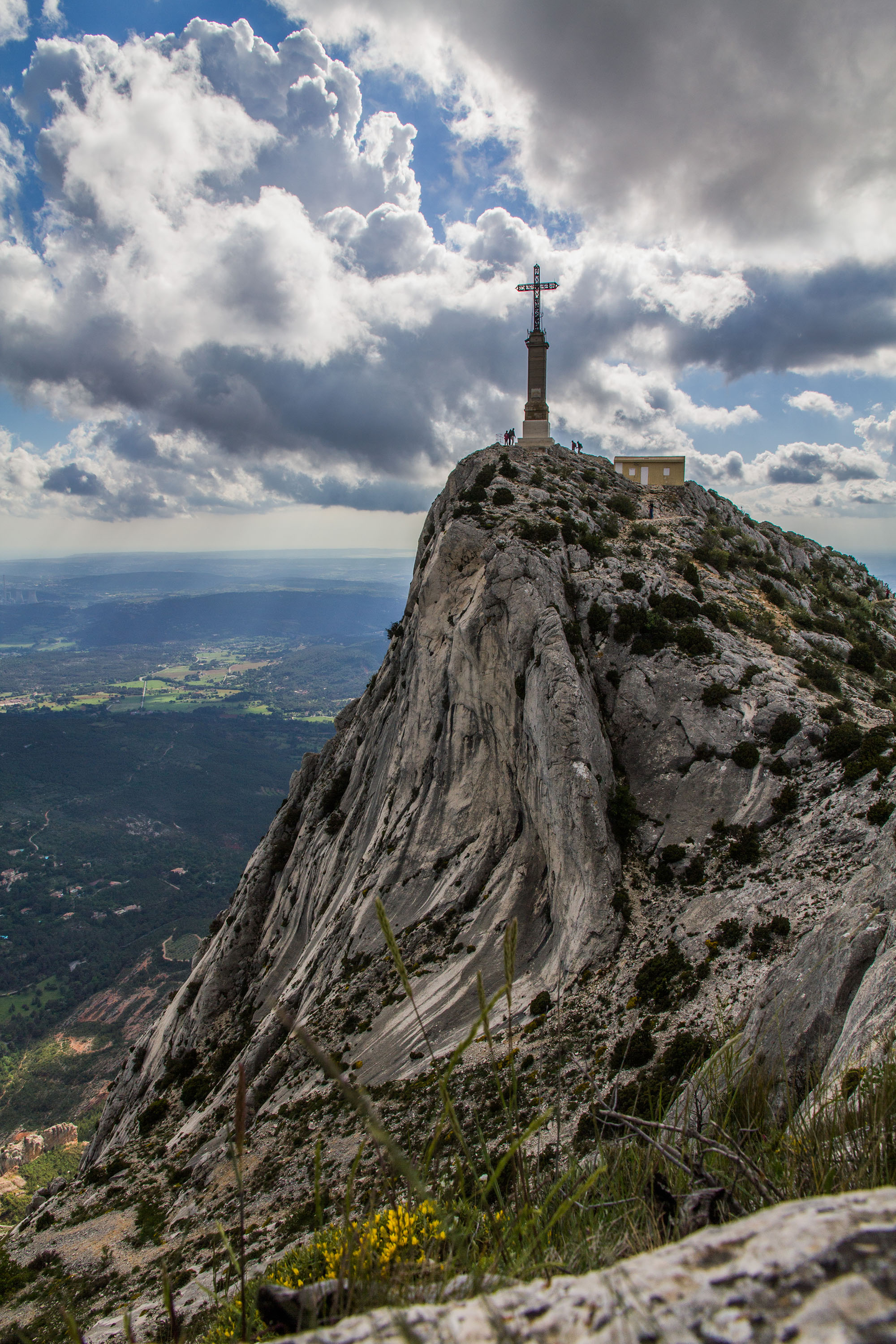
Cross of Provence on the western end of the Montagne Sainte-Victoire

The Cross of Provence is a monument located on the western end of the Montagne Sainte-Victoire in the Bouches-du-Rhône department in southern France.

The cross was erected on the most prominent western peak of the massif at 946 metres (3,103 ft 8 in) meters, rather than on the Pic des Mouches, the highest point, at 1,011 metres (3,316 ft 11 in).

The current monument is the fourth to be erected, the other three having suffered the ravages of time.

It overlooks the chapel of Notre-Dame de la Victoire, a 17th-century priory undergoing restoration, and the mediaeval "chapelle Venture".

== First cross ==
The first cross of Provence was erected in the 16th century by a sailor "on the first mountain he saw" after surviving a shipwreck. The monument was made of wood and had two iron anchors at its base.

== Second cross ==
The second cross was erected in 1785 by Jean Laurans. This cross was similar in appearance to the first, but deteriorated rapidly.

== Third cross ==
Less than 70 years later, in 1842, a third cross was erected. The initiative came from a law student in Aix-en-Provence. It was a focus for pilgrimages in Provence, but habitual removal of mementos caused rapid deterioration which, combined with the violence of the mistral lead to its destruction.

== Fourth cross ==
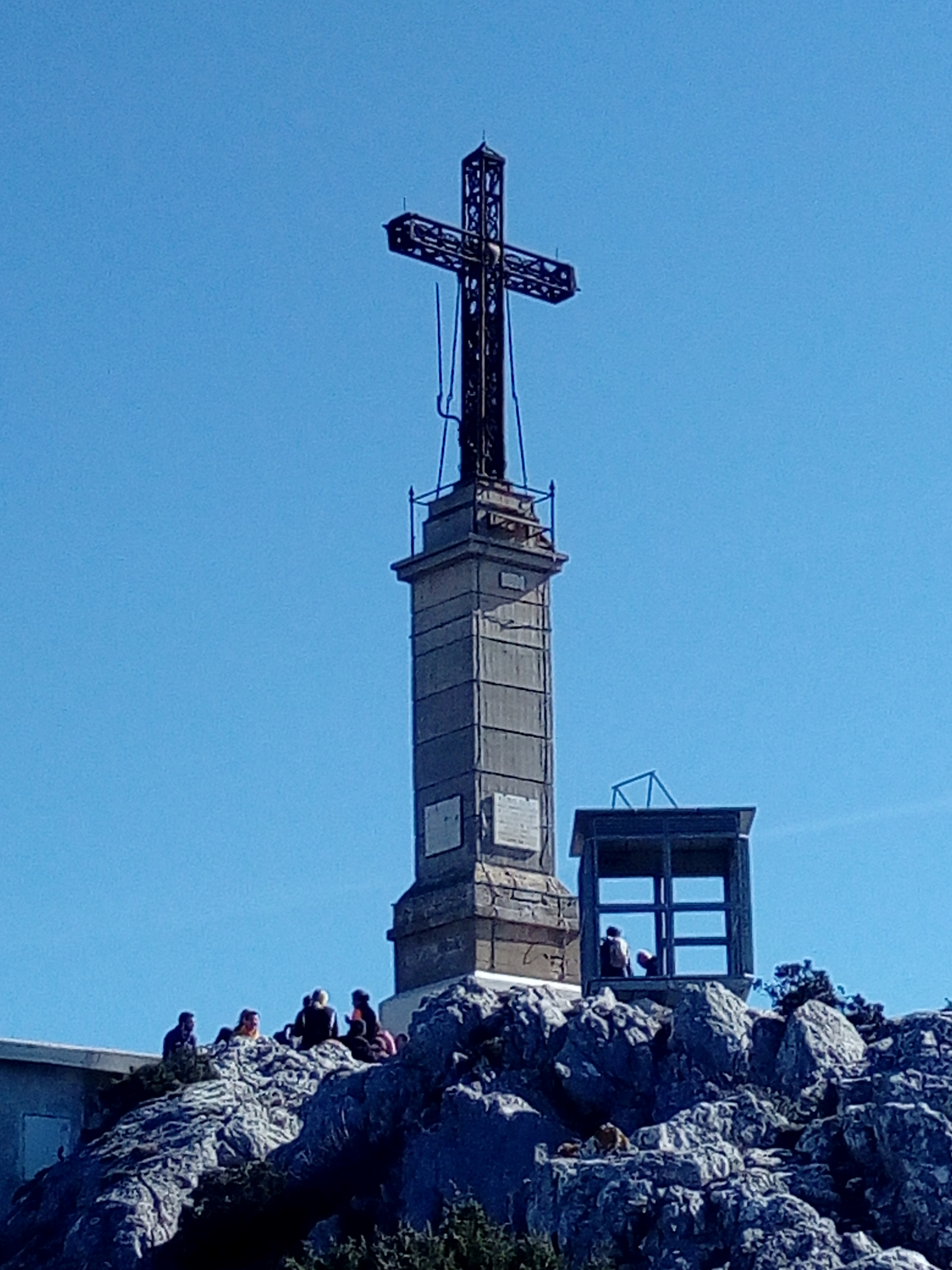
Croix de Provence

The current cross was built in 1875, on the initiative of the parish priest of Rousset, Father Meissonnier, to ward off two evils: smallpox and the aftermath of the Franco-Prussian War of 1870.

The cross is 18.25 metres (59 ft 11 in) high. The metal base of the cross contains the names of its subscribers and the 104 donor parishes of the Archdiocese of Aix-en-Provence and Arles and the Archdiocese of Embrun.

On May 18, 1875, it was solemnly blessed by the Archbishop of Aix (Théodore-Augustin Forcade), in the presence of 3,000 faithful.

The base contains four inscriptions:

- Facing Rome, in Latin: "God very good, very great, O Cross, strength of God and ours, hello! May your light so sweet to hearts that love Jesus, and so merciful to those who, alas, do not love him, shine in the distance”;
- Facing Paris, in French: "Croix de Provence, blessed by Monsignor Théodore-Augustin Forcade, Archbishop of Aix, Arles and Embrun, May 18, 1875";
- Facing Marseille, in Greek: "Here, sailors, your lighthouse, merchants, your gain, workers, your rest and your wealth";. »
- Facing Aix-en-Provence, in Provençal: “O Croix, salut! Source of eternal light, with the blood of a God, O written testament, Provence at your feet was the first to bow. Protect Provence, O cross of Jesus Christ."

=== Restoration ===
The monument was restored for the first time in 1982, then in 2004 when the old plinth was replaced by a stone-coloured, reinforced concrete facing, which forms a 360 degree viewing bench. The 2004 restoration was necessitated by several lightning strikes in 2002 and 2003.

== See also ==
- Col de la Croix de Fer
