= Mont Sainte-Victoire (Cézanne) =

Painting series by Paul Cézanne

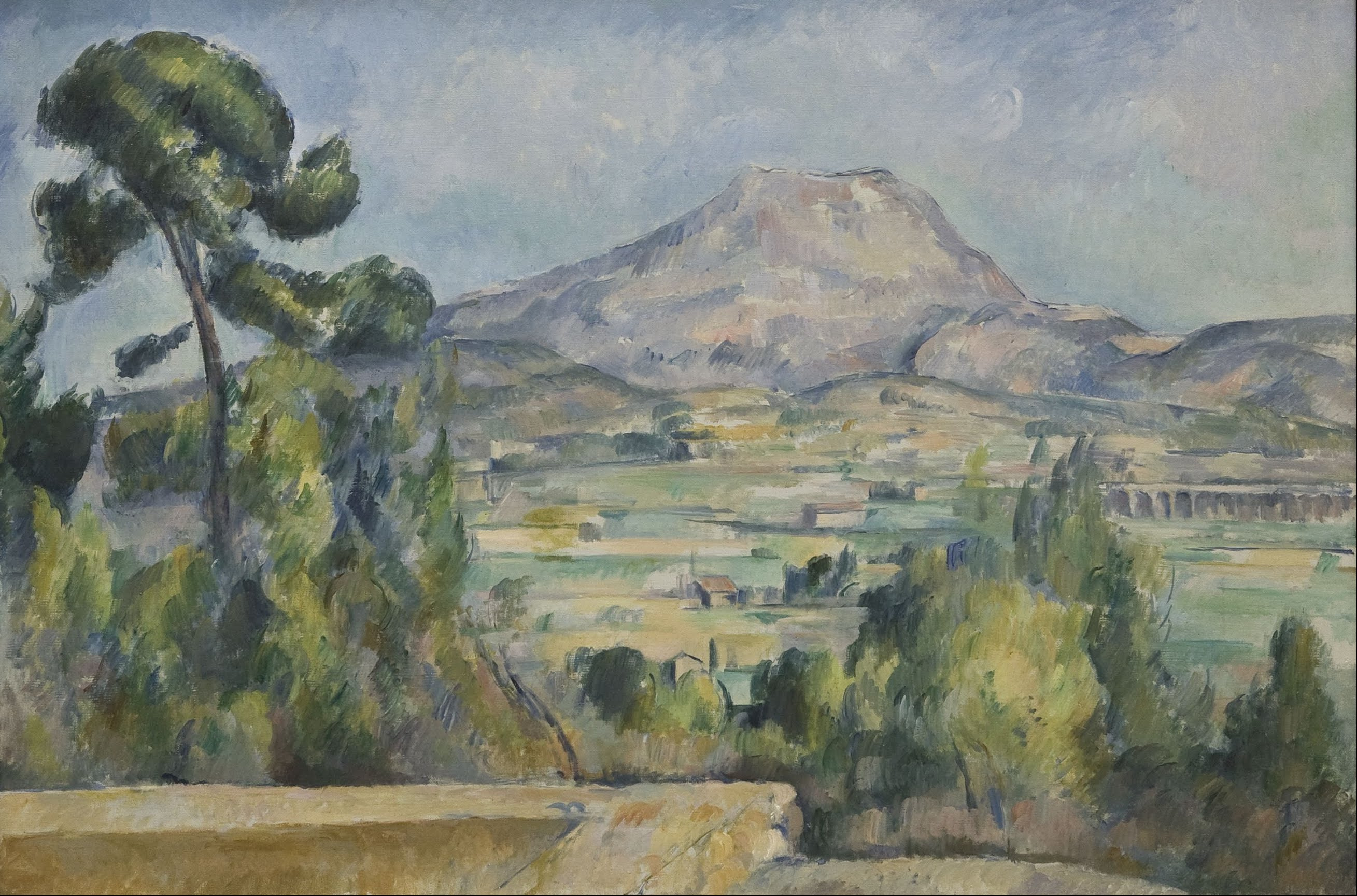
- Artist: Paul Cézanne
- Year: 1870-1906
- Medium: Oil on canvas
- Location: Various (Musée d'Orsay, Kunstmuseum Basel, Courtauld Gallery, Scottish National Gallery, Cleveland Museum of Art, Detroit Institute of Arts, Metropolitan Museum of Art, Philadelphia Museum of Art, The Phillips Collection)

Mont Sainte-Victoire is a series of oil paintings by French artist Paul Cézanne, depicting the French mountain Montagne Sainte-Victoire in Provence.

== Description ==
Montagne Sainte-Victoire is a mountain in southern France, overlooking Aix-en-Provence. It became the subject of a number of Cézanne's paintings, in total numbering about eighty paintings and watercolors.

Only half a year after the opening of the Aix–Marseille railway line on October 15, 1877, Cézanne wrote to his friend Émile Zola on April 14, 1878, praising Mont Sainte-Victoire—seen from the train as it crossed the Arc River Valley bridge—as a “beau motif” (“beautiful motif”). Around this time, at the age of thirty-nine, Cézanne began, for the first time, a series of paintings devoted to Mont Sainte-Victoire in his native Aix-en-Provence. It is therefore highly probable that this celebrated series was inspired by the scenery viewed from the window of a moving train.

Indeed, in numerous works from the Mont Sainte-Victoire series, the railway bridge on the Aix–Marseille line, which crosses the Arc River Valley, is depicted near the center-right of the composition.

Mont Sainte-Victoire became one of Cézanne's most repeated and varied themes, with Cézanne changing something about the scene each time, from his angle to the lighting to the compositional specifics to the mood he tried to evoke. Cézanne used three primary vantage points for these paintings: near his brother-in-law property in Bellevue, near Bibemus quarry, and in Les Lauves. His scenes generally included Mont Sainte-Victoire itself, a grey-white limestone mountain, and the surrounding valley and plains that the mountain rose from.

Cézanne's Mont Sainte-Victoire paintings fell into two main periods: those he executed during his so-called "period of synthesis," from roughly the 1870s to 1895, and those he created during his late period, from around 1895 until his death in 1906. Through both periods, Cézanne painted in watercolor as well as oil paints to capture Mont Sainte-Victoire with more transparency and lightness.

These paintings belong to Post-Impressionism. Cézanne used geometry to describe nature and different colours to represent the depth of objects. Cézanne generally tried to convey the eternal, interior structure of the scene before him, more than the ephemeral surface features. While the Impressionists tried to depict nature directly as they saw it, Cézanne generally tried to convey a sense of what was beneath what the naked eye could see, though he still had a sharp eye for subtle changes in light and atmosphere. Cézanne tried to evoke emotions through his works and "find order in his sensations." The whole series embodies Cézanne's struggle to mold nature into art through geometric forms and effects of color.

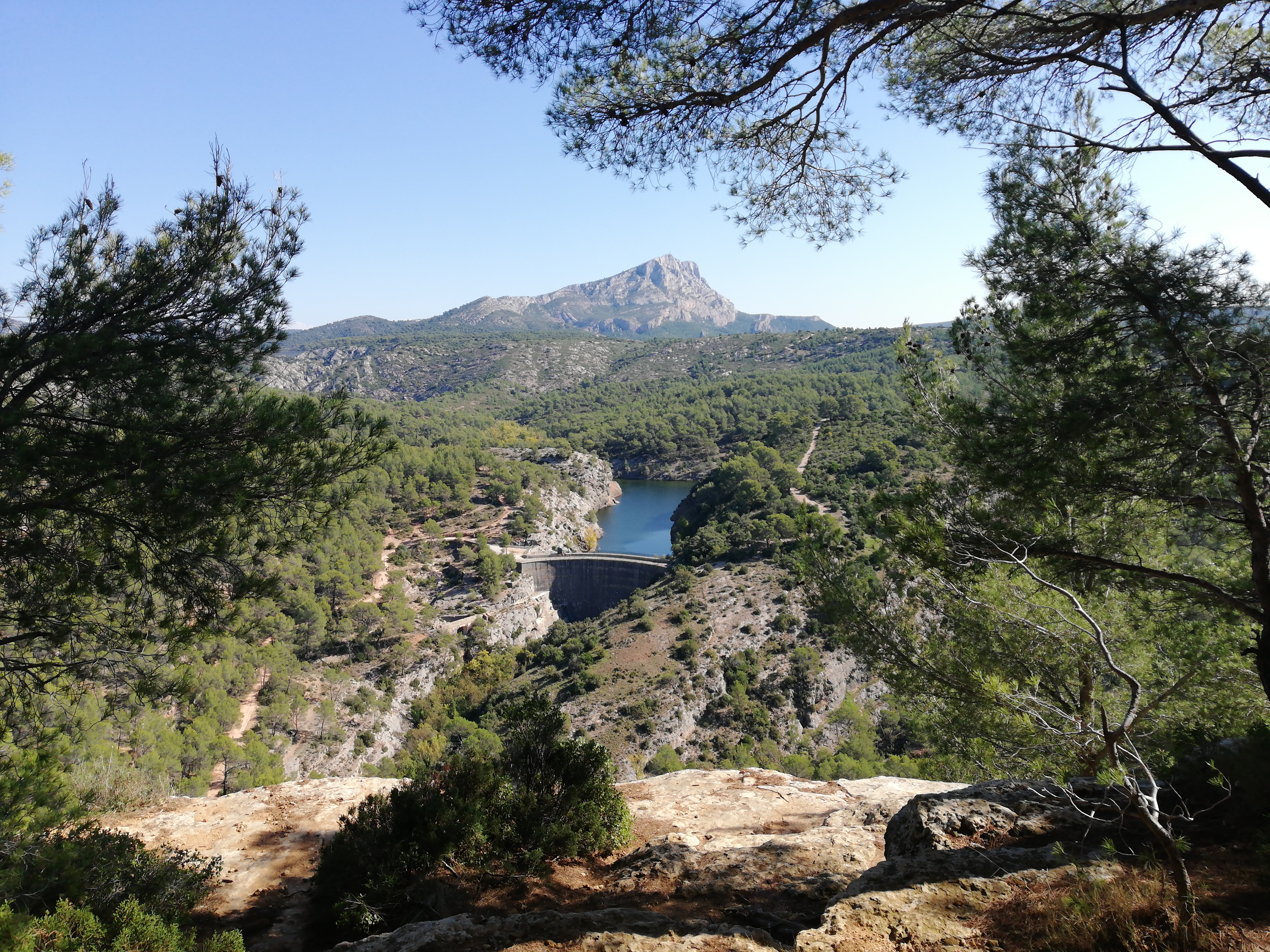
A picture of Montagne Sainte-Victoire

== Cézanne background and context ==
Cézanne lived in Aix for most of his life. He inherited his family estate after the death of his father, and was free of financial worries for the first time in his life, making him able to focus on art, which he pursued with "extraordinary patience and self-discipline."

However, after his mother died in 1897, he was forced to sell his property outside Aix to settle her estate among him and his two sisters, Marie and Rose. The house finally sold in 1899. The loss of this house was a significant emotional blow for Cézanne. He ended up buying a property just north of Aix, on the hill Les Lauves, and built a studio in 1902. The property had a large view of Aix and the vast surrounding plains, including Mont Sainte-Victoire. This was where he completed most of his late period paintings.

While Monet tried to finish landscape paintings in single sessions to capture the moment, Cézanne returned to Mont Sainte-Victoire repeatedly to accumulate a deep idea of the subject. This process resulted in literally timeless paintings, with the paintings not obviously reflecting a certain time of day, season, or even weather condition. Cézanne tried to create a clear sense of the interior structure of the landscape. He distorted the forms of Mont Sainte-Victoire subtly to create clear geometric shapes and pictorial balance.

Cézanne was finally able to exhibit a one-man show in Paris in 1895, endorsed by Ambroise Vollard. It did not attract widespread attention, but it proved influential on younger artists, and Cézanne gradually acquired a "legendary reputation." His subsequent influence, before and after his death, has been varied but enduring.

Cézanne turned against Impressionist naturalism to create a Post-Impressionist, Symbolist aesthetic. This developed specifically in the landscape tradition. Many artists at the time were reacting against the realism of Impressionist naturalism because of its emphasis on the transient. They wanted to pursue something more concrete and structured in order to arrive at a greater sense of truth in their paintings. This sentiment led to the Symbolist tradition.

Landscape painters in the Symbolist tradition explored how the power of color and form could evoke emotion. They were interested in ambiguity and the emotive power of color and form. Some used the creation of timeless and subjective landscapes as a form of escapism. Cézanne specifically, in these paintings, explored the relationship between surface and depth, between plane and color, drawing tension between order and emotion. For Cézanne, Mont Sainte-Victoire embodied nature's grandeur and enduring nature. He was convinced that each new painting of Mont Sainte-Victoire would offer some new insight into "another facet of its meaning or character," with the mountain assuming an abstract, elusive appeal.

This period of paintings as a whole is crucial to understanding Cézanne's later work. They display "powerful geometric reductiveness," foreshadowing Cubism and abstraction.

== Period of synthesis paintings ==
Cézanne's work during this period was filled with direct light and sharply outlined forms. These paintings were deeply "preconceived and pondered." He tended to compose paintings in lines or bands across his canvases. In his landscapes, including the paintings of Mont Sainte-Victoire, Cézanne liked to modify and simplify the scenes. This broke the landscape norm of composing in planes in order to define depth. Cézanne's landscapes also tended to have asymmetrical compositions, as well as broad and thick brushstrokes, to the point that he sometimes used the palette knife.

The bulk of Cézanne's Mont Sainte-Victoire paintings during this period were from the mid-1880s on. Most of these works were executed with Cézanne situated east of Aix. He was particularly drawn to Mont Sainte-Victoire for its clarity and stark geometric form. In his works, Cézanne generally strove to unify rhythm, form, and color. His works became the most detailed from 1884-1888, and became more loose and "visionary" later on.

Cézanne's Mont Sainte-Victoire paintings during this period generally displayed an extended profile of the mountain dominating the familiar valley. In some, a railroad bed cuts across the fields, with the arched viaduct crossing the middle ground. Houses and farm buildings dot the landscape. Many features "assume the weight of its history," like the train trestle that transforms into an ancient aqueduct, resembling a Roman road. These features, as well as careful placement of the trees, allowed more fluid and intimate access to the mountain.

A few paintings explore the relationship between the mountain, the single pine, the viaduct, and the ridge of Le Cengle. Cézanne climbed up and down the incline to test different views of this scene and these motifs. He enjoyed the interplay of the firmer planes of the landscape and mountain and the musicality of the trees. He would use structures, like the viaduct and arches, to introduce rhythm and pattern into the landscape. This rhythm gave the paintings a sense of unity and intention that is very different from Cézanne's later paintings, making them more accessible than isolated. Cézanne often used a single pine as a framing device, like a curtain, which was generally placed on the left. This device was probably derived from his work with Pissarro.

In general, these paintings contain a relaxed gradation of greens, grays, and blues that imbue this series of paintings with more of a sense of peacefulness. They tend to be more consistent and transparent, creating atmospheric effects unique in Cézanne's repertoire. In one painting with a single pine, the dark brown of the trunk and brighter green of the needles set up an effective contrast to the calmer background, giving the effect of "tranquil release." In another, all the colors are more translucent, creating a sense of awe and structure sometimes aided by Chinese white paint, which had an "opalescent" quality.

In the painting Mont Sainte-Victoire Seen from the Bibémus Quarry, c. 1897, as an example from this period, Cézanne concentrated on the peak of the mountain, floating above the reddish rocks below it. The mountain rises above the smooth, angular quarry, the crest tying the landscape together and providing a sense of stability. Mont Sainte-Victoire acts as a counterpoint to the dynamic perspective of the foreground. The work was painted from a high vantage point, with the tops of the pine trees as visual entry points to the scene. The viewers encounter this warm green gate before the cold rocks beyond.

In another example of this period, Mont Sainte-Victoire seen from above the Tholonet Road, c. 1896-8, the mountain looms overhead, effectively displacing the sky. This painting similarly utilizes warm, red tones across the landscape and cool, blue tones across the mountain and sky, with the clear light exposing the dry air. This work is more reductive than his past works; the higher vantage point allows the slope of the valley leading into the mountain to lie open and the foreground to be reduced, and Mont Sainte-Victoire to stand boldly and clearly before the viewer. Pine trees anchor the composition, giving it a sense of stability. It has a vertical format, emphasizing the upwards formation of the mountain. This vertical format is only present in two of Cézanne's other paintings of Mont Sainte-Victoire.

As a final example, in Cézanne's canvas at the Musée d'Orsay, the viaduct is included, as usual, but the road was obscured, reorienting the features of the landscape. The painting emphasizes horizontal elements in the composition. In this work, Cézanne blended and undercut colors; green, ocher, and blue shades are set against shades of lavender and chartreuse yellow, brightening the painting. It has a blended and smooth quality that is less crisp and clear than his other, more architectural works. This painting also notably has a more golden hue and autumnal color than his other contemporary works, presaging his later Mont Sainte-Victoire works.

== Late period paintings ==
Cézanne's Late Period ran from about 1895 until his death in 1906, but most of his works of Mont Sainte-Victoire came from the time after Cézanne bought property just north of Aix in 1902. From 1902-1906, Cézanne painted Mont Sainte-Victoire eleven times in oil paint, and many more in watercolor. This period was defined by more saturated colors, less stable compositions, and a more clear division of forms into smaller parts, as dictated by Cézanne's thick brushstrokes. He created his forms with discrete patches of intense color, developing his compositions by considering the elements of the paintings as geometric shapes imbued with color. The structure constructed from these shapes became stronger and then more implied, in order to emphasize emotional intensity. The subject matter was almost unrecognizable within the brushstrokes, pointing the way toward abstraction. Cézanne's analytical approach to these unpopulated landscapes caused the paintings to seem distanced from humanity.

In the paintings Cézanne did from this period, the mountain was often shown in dramatic profile, the peak rising over the surrounding plain, which spread out in a patchwork of farm buildings, trees, and fields. They are imbued with a sense of urgency and anticipation. Cézanne emphasized the roughness of nature in these paintings by combining the stark, architectural forms of the landscape and mountain with the wild, lyrical vegetation. He did not seek to represent nature traditionally, but rather to, first and foremost, express the consistent, permanent nature of the structure beneath the surface.

In several of the Mont Sainte-Victoire paintings, Cézanne left parts of the canvas bare. Furthermore, he often used diluted oil paint and watercolor. He saw these as giving him greater freedom and flexibility, painting faster, lighter, and with more fluidity. The fleeting lighting and weather in which some of his paintings were made led to many of them being left unfinished. This unfinished quality of Cézanne's works was a continuation of the Impressionists' method of intentionally making their paintings look unfinished, or sketch-like.

In one painting from this period, simply entitled Mont Sainte-Victoire, and which is now in the Annenberg Collection, Cézanne constructed the painting on five different pieces of canvas that were pieced together over time. His brushstrokes cut across pieces of canvas to create one cohesive image, but the addition of these pieces "provides an explanation of [the painting's] development." This multi-canvas technique was rare for Cézanne, but was not unique among the Impressionists; Degas also used this technique, but any direct connection between the two is unlikely. Here, the mountain is clear and pristine, its contours painted with a "brilliant" blue. The western slope is constructed with minute, transparent brushwork over a white primer, and reflects the light shining over the landscape, while the northern slope is darkened in shadow. The sky is painted in even strokes of green, blue, and lavender, with patches of white interjected as passing clouds, while the valley rolls forward in layers of green and ocher towards the farmhouse, which stands firm and geometric among the surrounding, more musical trees and fields. Broader and wetter brushstrokes accompany the composition downwards, along with tighter and more constricted color modulations, while to the right of the mountain, the upright brushstrokes in the plain likewise get broader and more energetic. This conveys a sense of acceleration from left to right, to the point of the space seeming to bend as the brushstrokes get larger and the color gets thinner. The greens and blues in the right third of the sky also get more energetic and abstract and sweep off the canvas. Much of the canvas is left bare in the energy and excitement in which Cézanne produced the painting, but still, the small farmhouse is clearly defined, establishing rhythm and recession. Cézanne's vision for the painting seems to have shifted as he worked on it, as evidenced by the additional strips of canvas and changing energy and style of brushstrokes. Throughout the painting, it is clear that Cézanne wrestled with the issue of trying to convey color while also expressing distance. The work's energy, geometric quality, and abstract look is emblematic of Cézanne's work during this late period.

== Influence on Cubism ==
The series has been associated in particular with the development of Cubism, though this connection remains debated among art historians. Critics such as Maurice Raynal and Clement Greenberg argued that Cezanne's geometric treatment of the mountain landscape, with its faceted planes and structural emphasis, provided crucial foundations for Cubist artists like Picasso and Braque.

However, recent scholarship has challenged the evolutionary interpretations that position Cezanne primarily as a precursor to abstraction. Art historians including Carol Donnell-Kotrozo have critiqued what James Ackerman termed the "destination model" of art history, arguing that Cezanne's formal innovations should be understood within his own representational intentions rather than as steps toward movements that followed.

== Critical reception ==
In general, Cézanne's Mont Sainte-Victoire series "have been discussed in the grandest terms." They are considered to represent Cézanne's transformation into the highest mode of his artistic ideals.

Lionello Venturi, for example, described the Mont Sainte-Victoire paintings as part of a "cosmic" creation, noting that "The structure is more and more implied, and less and less apparent." Cézanne himself noted, according to Joachim Gasquet, that the mountain held some sort of "cosmic" significance for him:

"Look at Ste.-Victoire. What élan, what an imperious thirst for the sun, and what melancholy, in the evening, when all this weightiness falls back to earth...These masses were made of fire. Fire is in them still. Both darkness and daylight seem to recoil from them in fear, trembling. There above us is Plato's cave: see how, as large clouds pass by, the shadow that they ast shudders on the rocks, as if burned, suddenly swallowed by a mouth of fire."

Such statements capture how Cézanne imbues Mont Sainte-Victoire with a sense of urgency and drama, and how he hoped his paintings would be received by viewers. Indeed, this perception has been echoed by critics like Fritz Novotny, who have argued that, in these works, Cézanne gave up real truth to nature. His Mont Sainte-Victoire paintings are simultaneously "timeless" and "quiet" as well as "turbulent" and "ecstatic."

Despite its grand ambitions, this series has "rarely been critically assessed or published," in the scheme of art history., although it was featured in the 1980 BBC television series 100 Great Paintings.

== Gallery ==
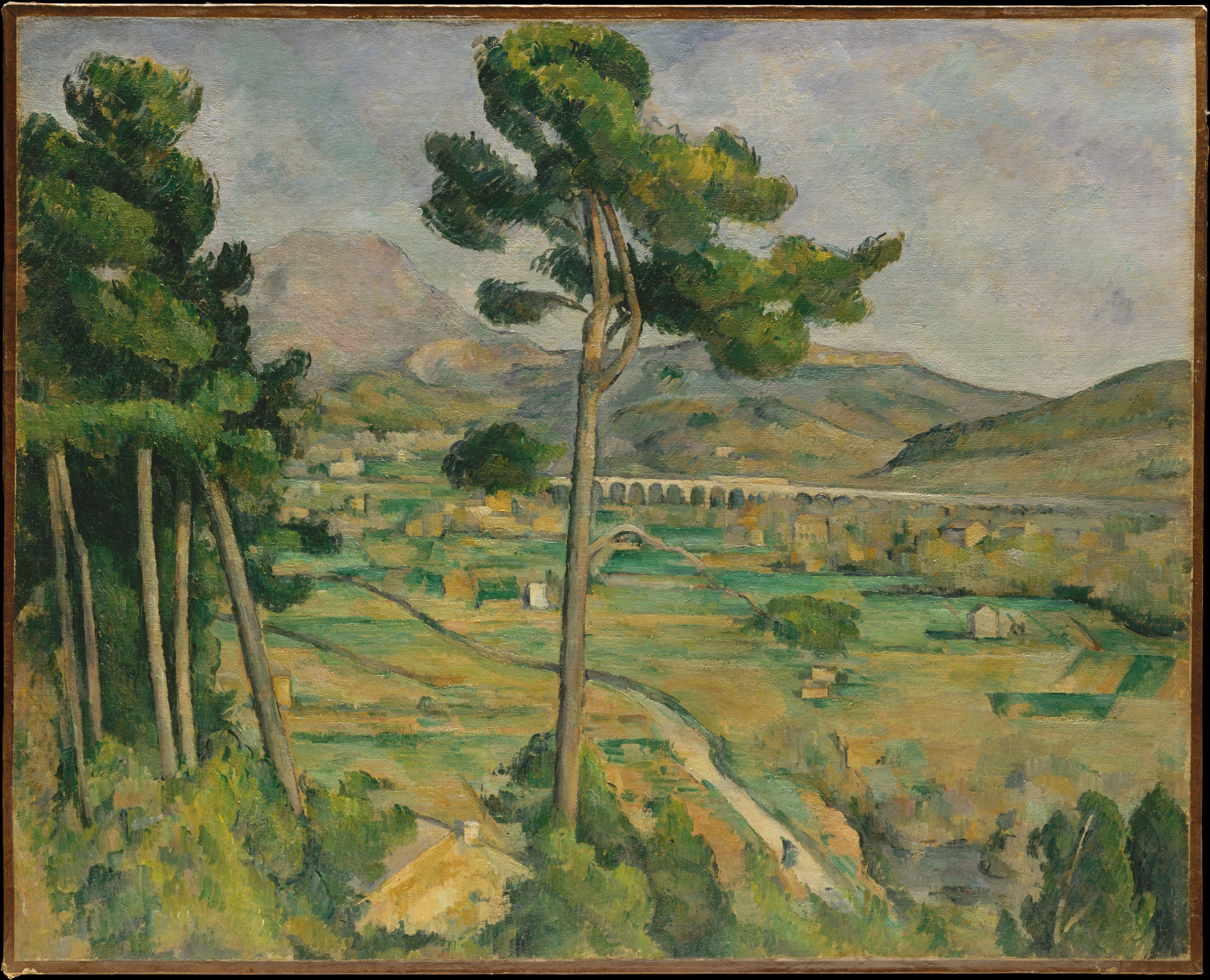
Mont Sainte-Victoire and the Viaduct of the Arc River Valley (1882–1885), Metropolitan Museum of Art

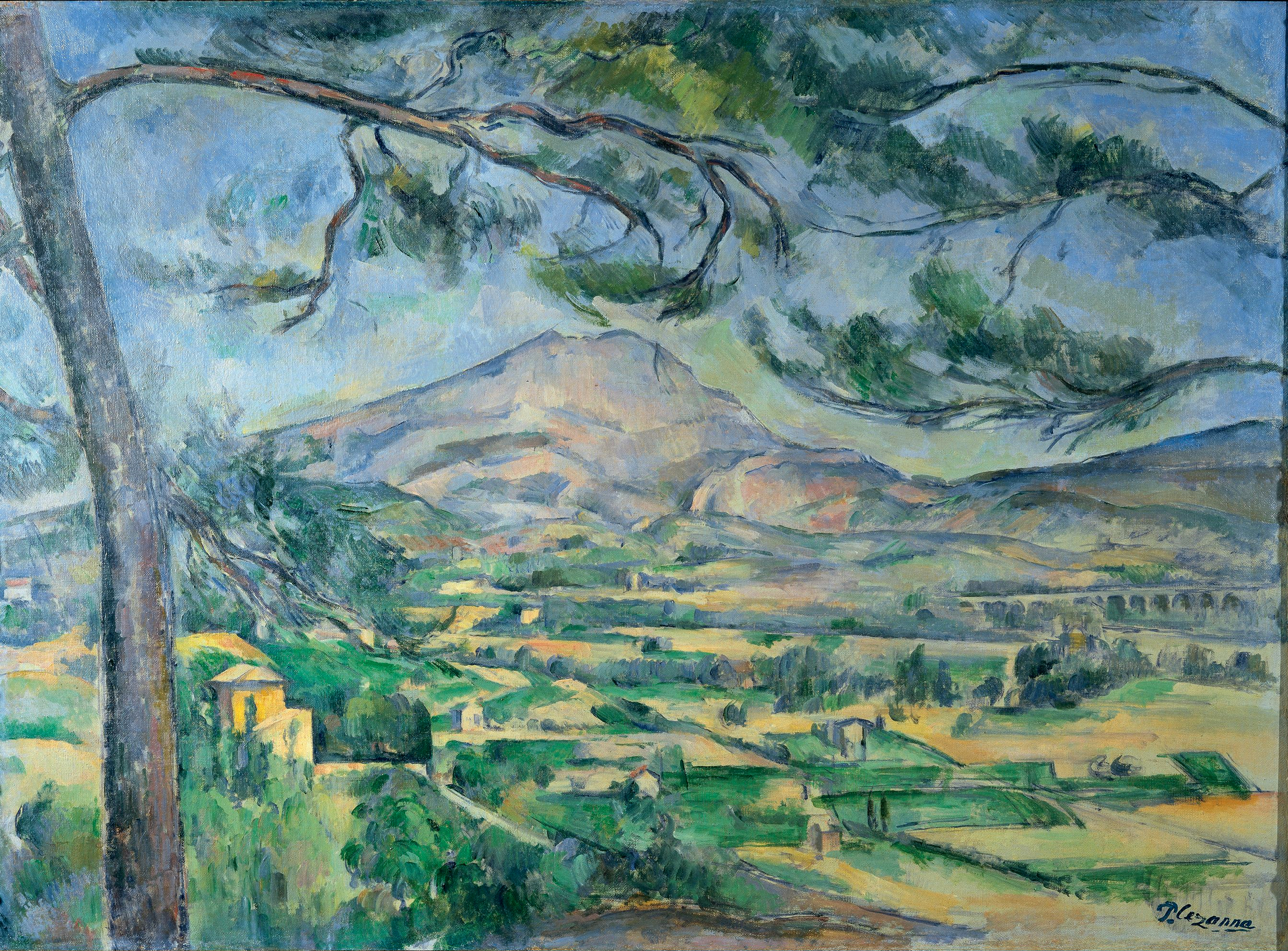
Mont Sainte-Victoire with Large Pine (c. 1887), Courtauld Institute of Art

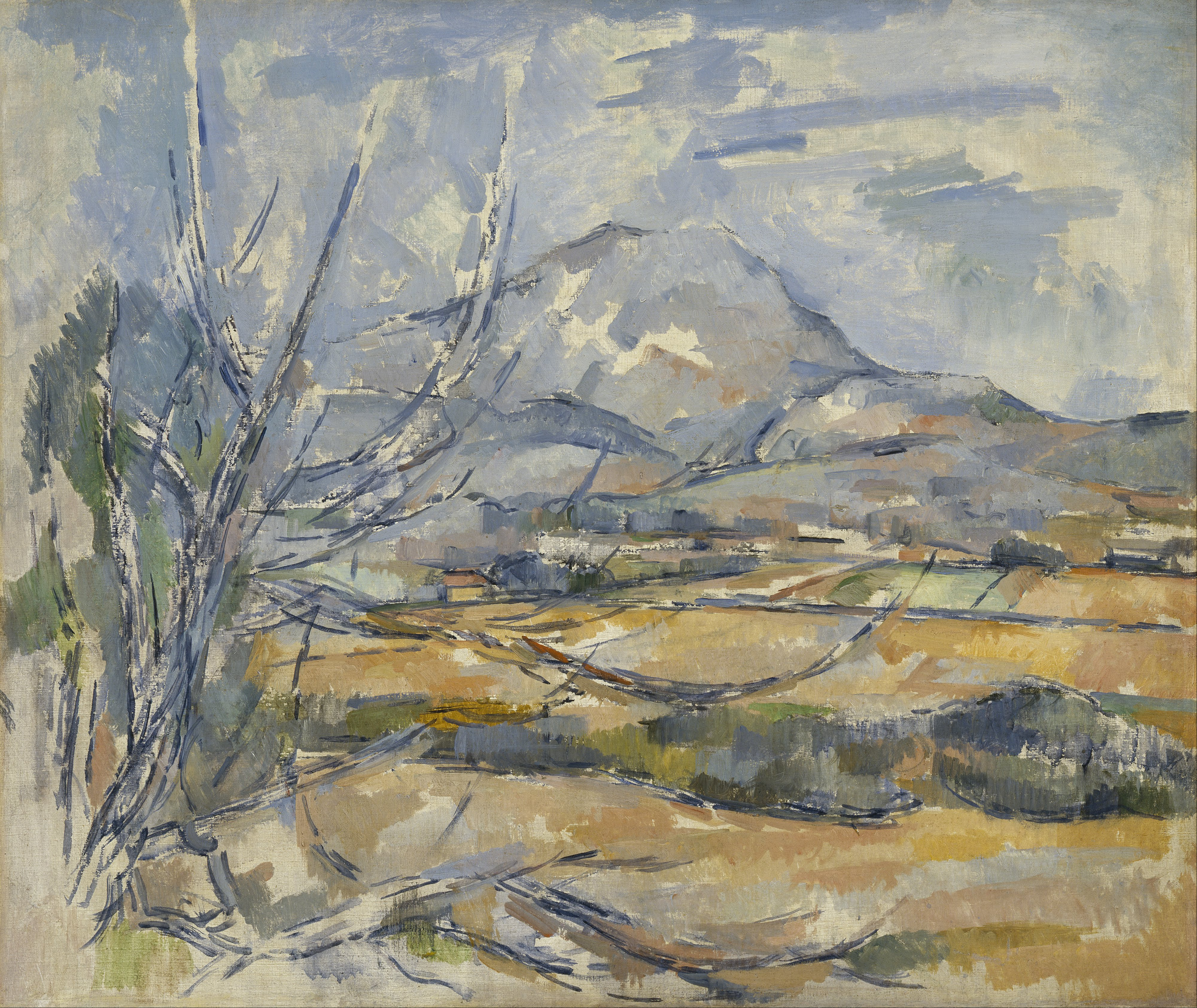
Montagne Sainte-Victoire, 1890, Scottish National Gallery

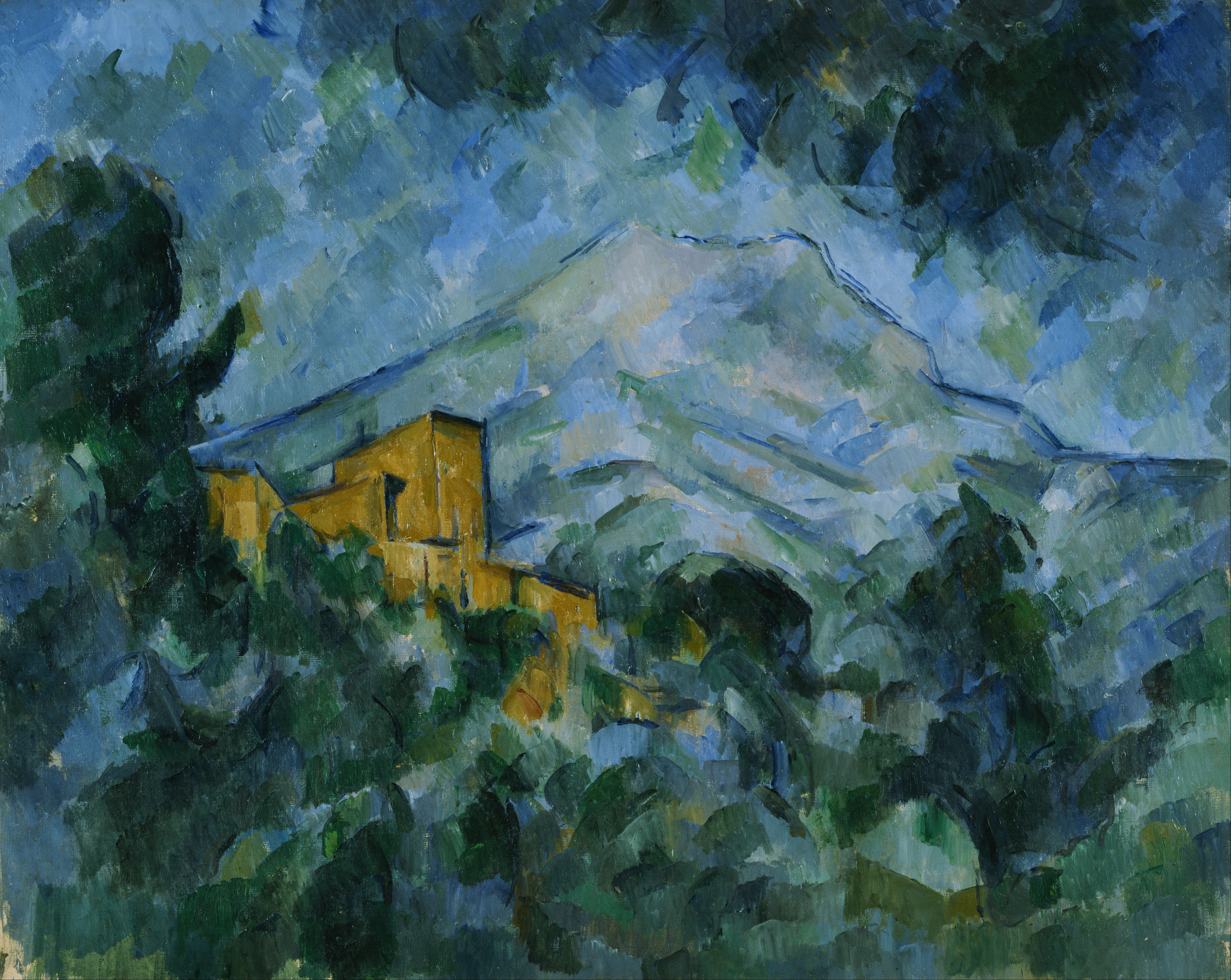
Mont Sainte-Victoire and Château Noir, 1904–1906, Artizon Museum, Tokyo

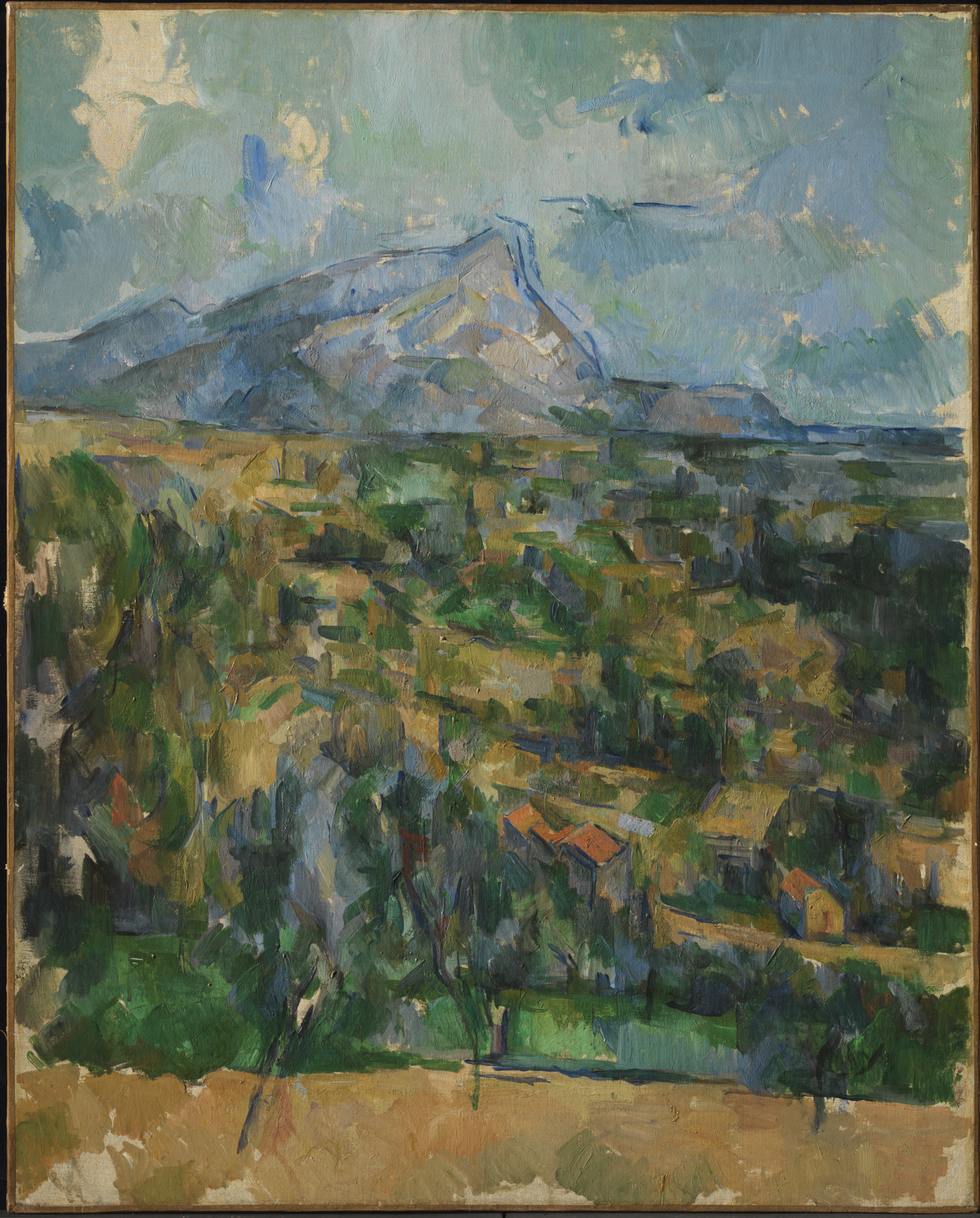
Mont Sainte-Victoire, 1904-1906, Princeton University Art Museum

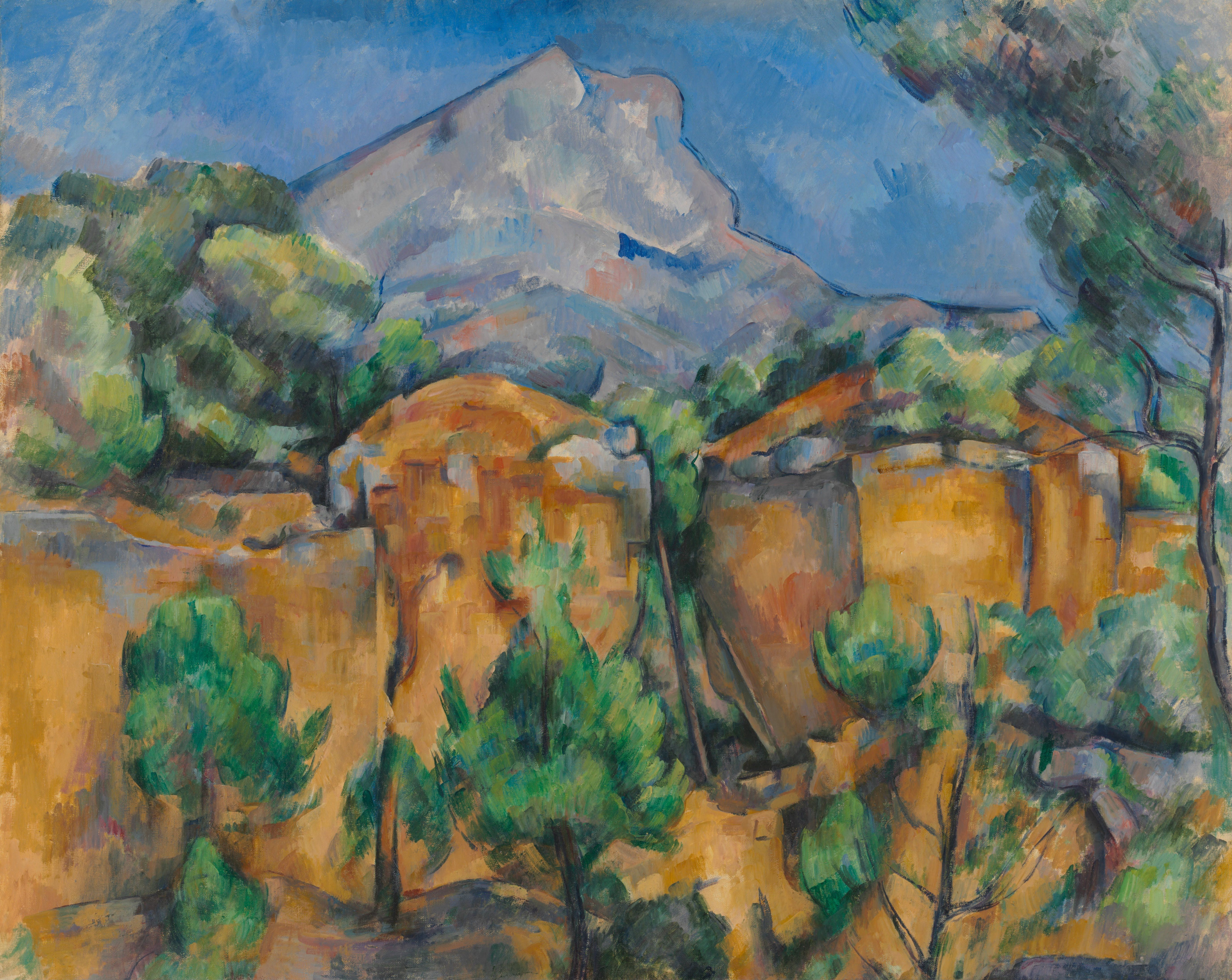
Mont Sainte-Victoire View From Bibémus Quarry, 1895-1899, Baltimore Museum of Art

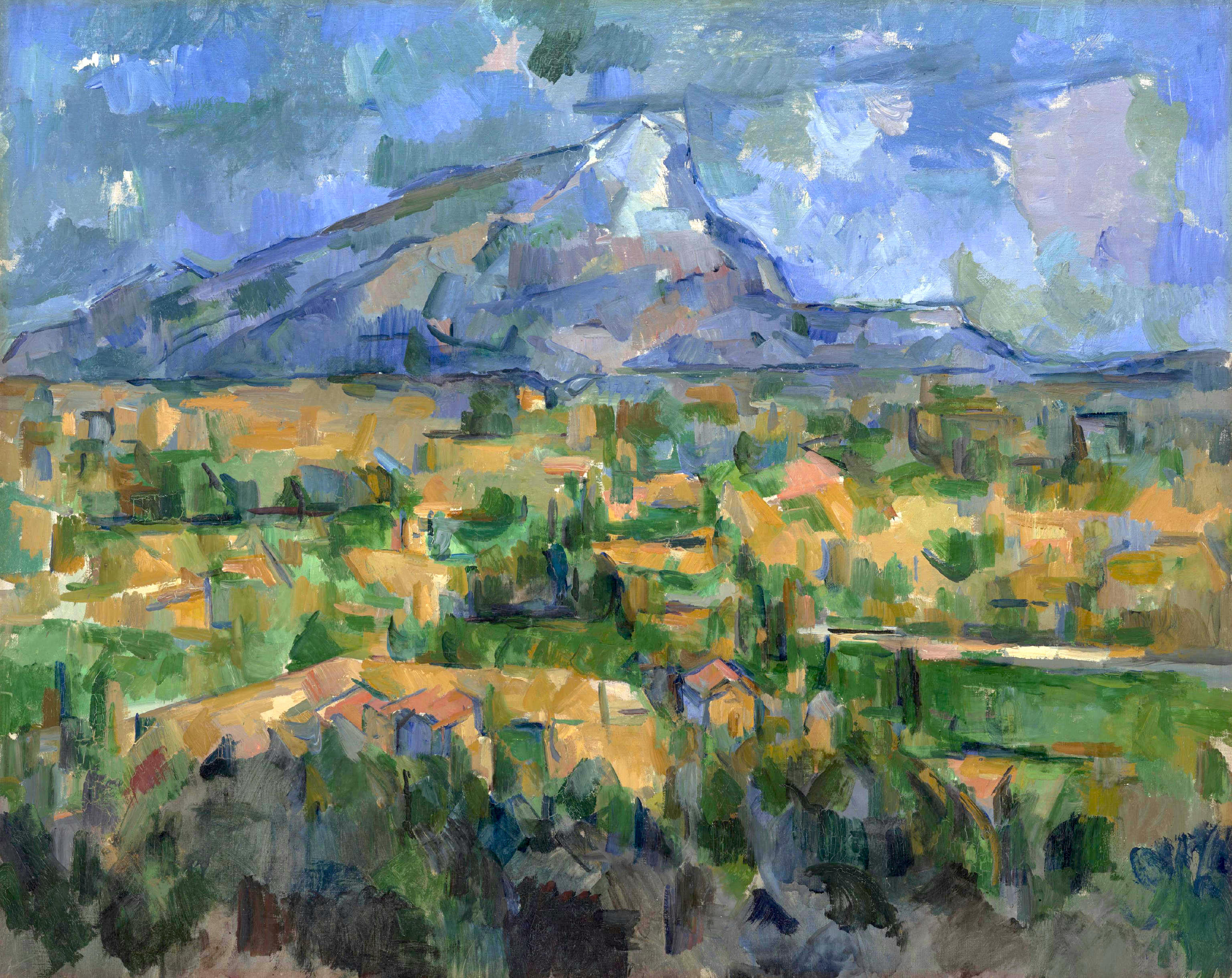
Mont Sainte-Victoire, 1904-1906, Philadelphia Museum of Art

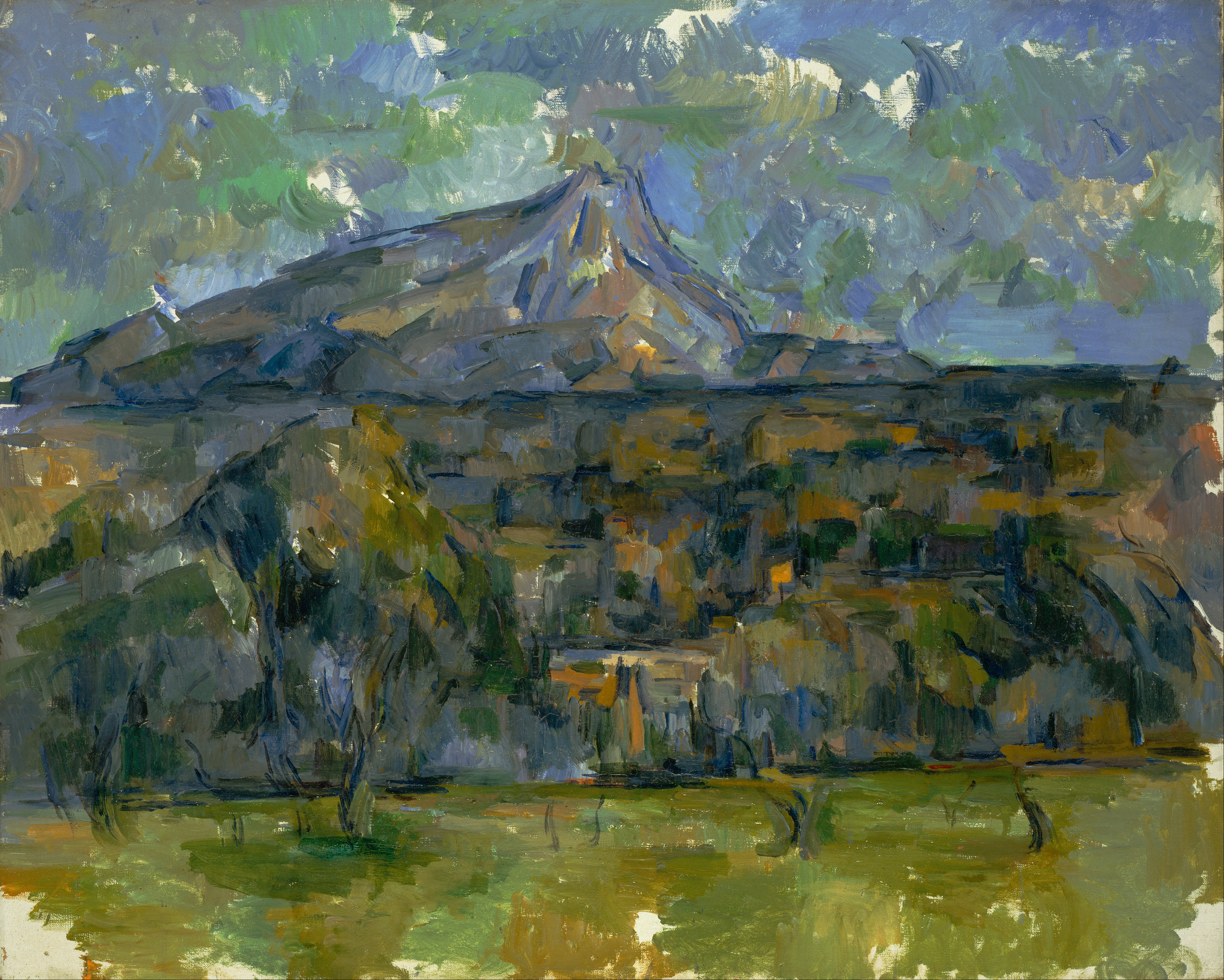
Mont Sainte-Victoire Seen From Les Lauves, 1902-1906, Nelson-Atkins Museum of Art

== See also ==
- List of paintings by Paul Cézanne
- Tomoki Akimaru, "Cézanne and the Railway (1) – (7): A Transformation of Vision in the 19th Century", Art Critique+, AICA (Association Internationale des Critiques d'Art) Japan, 21 April 2025.
