= Mont Sainte-Victoire with Large Pine =

Painting by Paul Cézanne

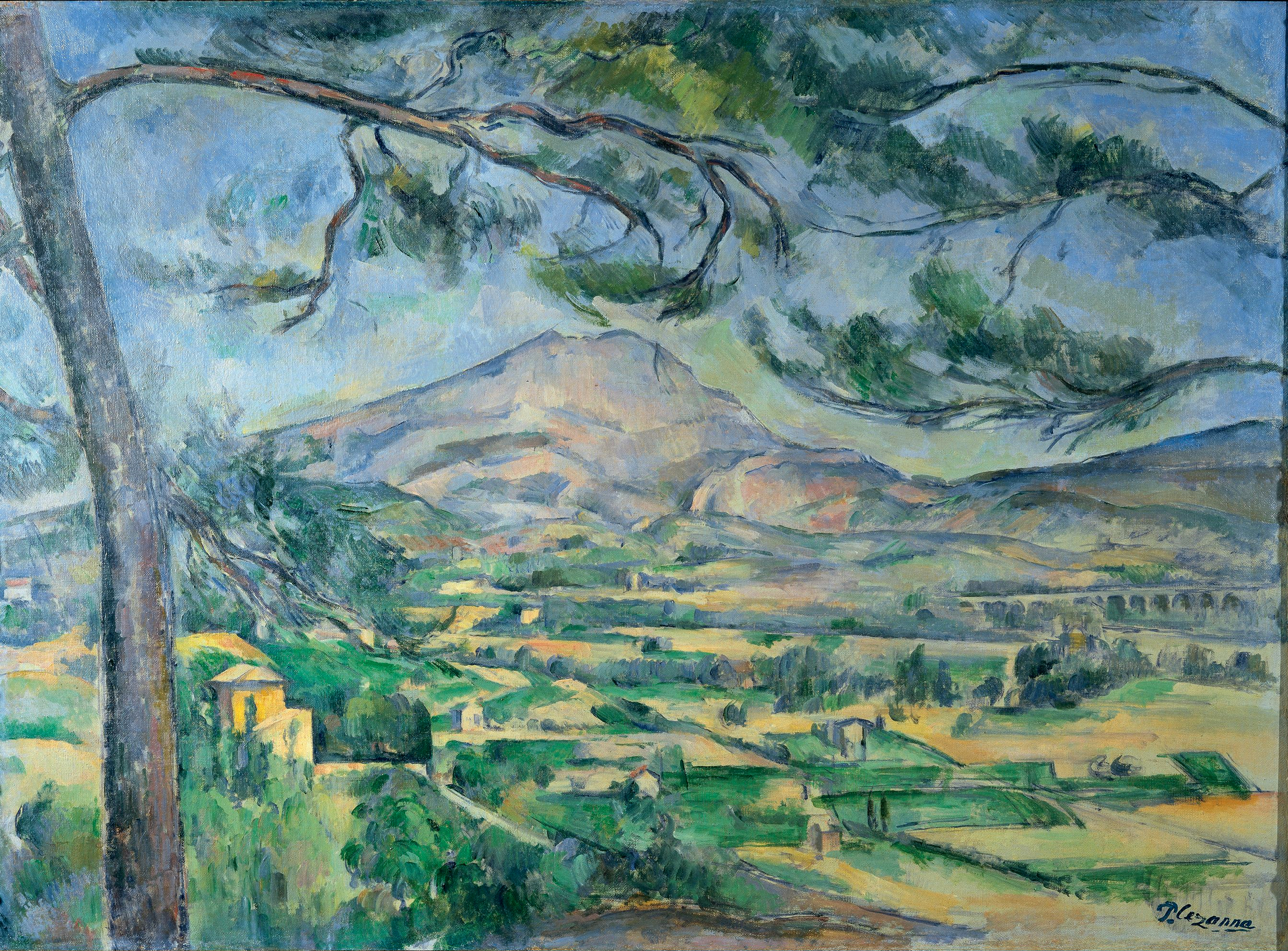
- Artist: Paul Cézanne
- Year: c. 1887
- Medium: Oil on canvas
- Dimensions: 67 cm × 92 cm (26 in × 36 in)
- Location: Courtauld Gallery, London

Mont Sainte-Victoire with Large Pine is an oil on canvas painting executed ca. 1887 by the French artist Paul Cézanne. It is owned by the Courtauld Institute of Art and on display in the Gallery at Somerset House. It belongs to a series of oil paintings of Mont Sainte-Victoire that Cézanne painted throughout his career.

== Description ==
The subject of the painting is the Montagne Sainte-Victoire in Provence in southern France. Cézanne spent a lot of time in Aix-en-Provence at the time, and developed a special relationship with the landscape.
In a letter to his friend Émile Zola, written on 14 April 1878, Cézanne described Mont Sainte-Victoire, as seen from the window of the train running from Aix to Marseille as follows: "What a beautiful motif." This letter was written about six months after the opening of the railway line. Around this time, at the age of thirty-nine, Cézanne finally began a series of paintings devoted to Mont Sainte-Victoire in his hometown—a subject he had never depicted before. Therefore, it is highly probable that Cézanne’s Mont Sainte-Victoire series was inspired by the scenery viewed from the window of the moving train.
This painting represents the Mont Sainte-Victoire seen from Montbriand in Aix-en-Provence. In the center on the right side of this picture s the railway bridge on the Aix-Marseille line at the Arc River Valley.

== Posterity ==
This Cézanne landscape can be seen through the windows of the triptych Une affaire de pommes n°2 (Cézanne) painted by Herman Braun-Vega in 1970 to celebrate Cézanne's role as the "creative father" of certain artistic movements.

== See also ==
- List of paintings by Paul Cézanne
- Tomoki Akimaru, Cézanne and the Railway (1) – (7): A Transformation of Vision in the 19th Century, Art Critique+, AICA Japan, 21 April 2025.

== Sources ==
- Tomoki Akimaru, "Cézanne and the Railway (1) – (7)", Art Critique+, AICA Japan, 21 April 2025.
