= Léon Indenbaum =

French sculptor

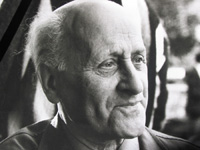
Léon Indenbaum

Léon Indenbaum was a Russian sculptor and artist of Jewish origin (naturalized French), born on 10 December 1890 at Chavusy (Belarus), died 29 September 1981 in Opio (France).

== Biography ==
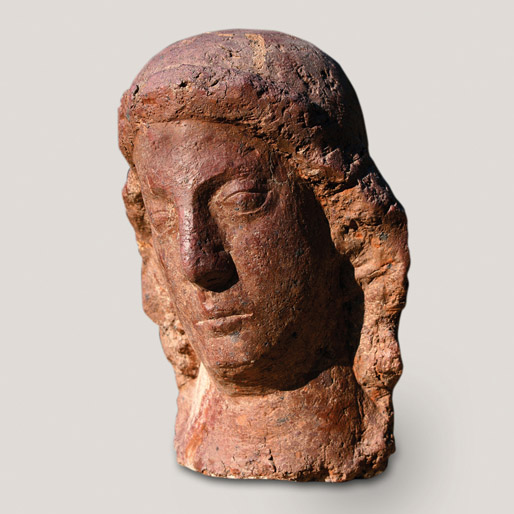
"Tête de femme" by Indenbaum

=== Childhood and studies ===
His father, a lace dealer, died prematurely. His grandfather, a popular art bookbinder, cared for him.

The young Leo was educated Hebrew for 12 to 13 years. He was then placed in a traditional school where they worked wood, and was noticed by its director and won a scholarship to joining the School of Fine Arts in Odessa, where he worked and carved wood glaiseit.

He then registered in the School of Applied Arts Antonolski in Vilnius (Lithuania).

=== La Ruche, Paris ===
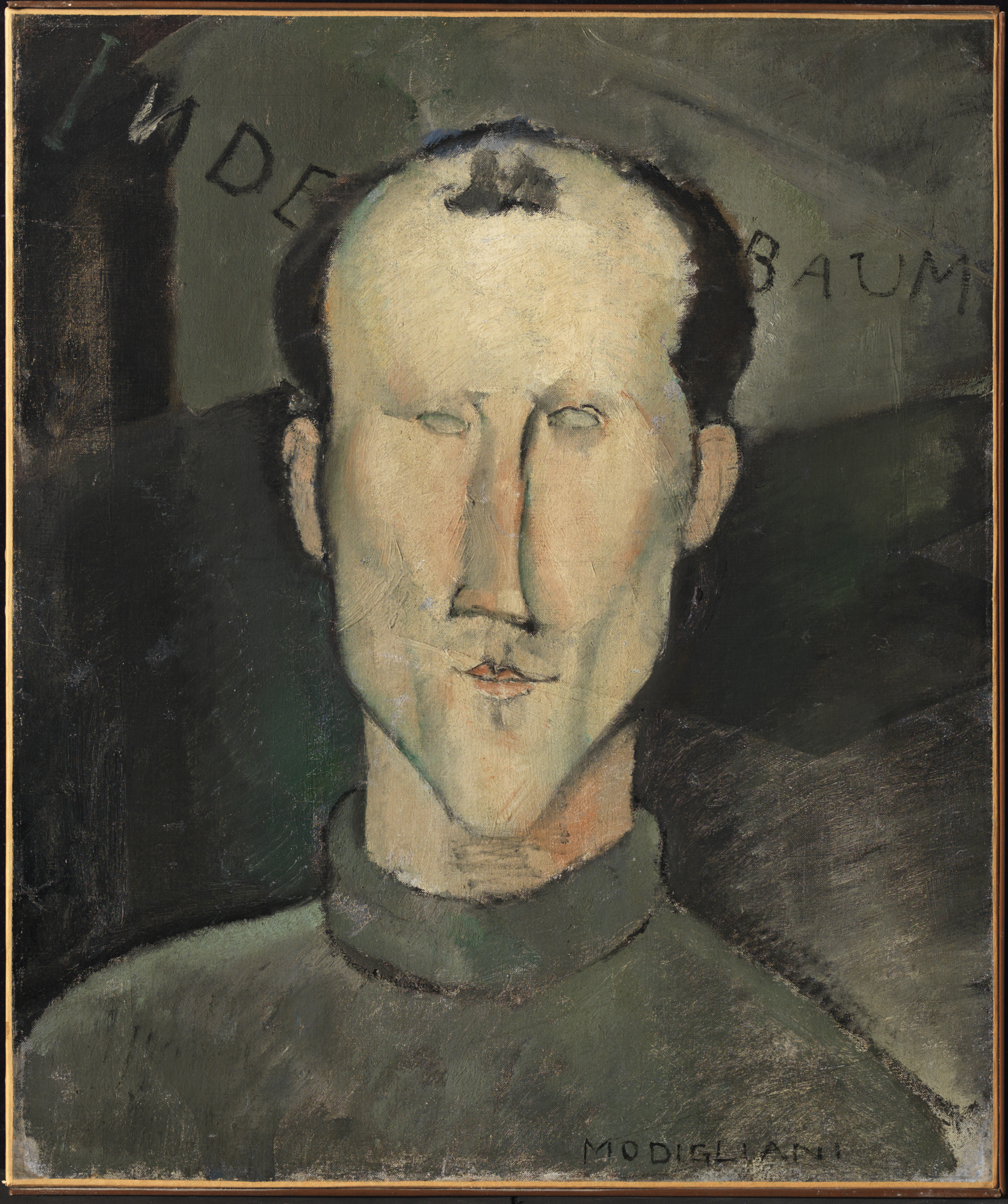
Amedeo Modigliani, Léon Indenbaum, 1916, Henry and Rose Pearlman Collection on long-term loan to the Princeton University Art Museum

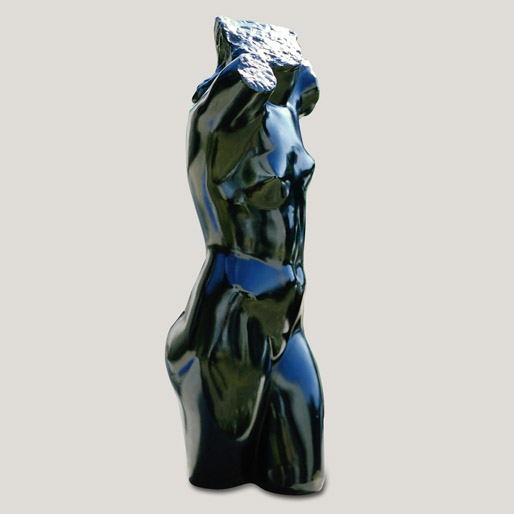
"Torse de femme" (1919) by Indenbaum

As a young man, he heard about Paris this time and this unique artistic atmosphere to which he aspired. He managed to reach the French capital in March 1911 and moved to "La Ruche" at Montparnasse in Paris.

He worked among talented young painters and sculptors, many of whom became famous and subsequently formed the School of Paris: Soutine, Kremegne, Chagall, Kikoïne, Epstein, Zadkineand later Modigliani who devoted a famous painting "Portrait de Leon Indenbaum" (Collection: The Henry and Rose Pearlman Foundation).

From 1911 to 1919, Leon Indenbaum will complete his artistic training in the workshop of the sculptor Antoine Bourdelle at Montparnasse, he had a predilection for the work of his pupil he called "mon jeune poulain" (my protegee)

By 1912, he outlines three stone sculptures at the Salon des Indépendants. During this period he became a close friend of Modigliani. Modigliani lived some time at Leon Indenbaum's where they shared their passion for art, before renting an artist studio together.

Jacques Doucet, the famous fashion designer and collector, was his first patron. Leon Indenbaum executed for him many decorative panels, he also worked some time for the decorator Coard, that he left because he could not sign his own works.

In 1925 he exhibited at Salon des Indépendants: "un buste de jeune fille" and "une femme couchée" (a bust of a girl and a woman lying, both made of stone) critically acclaimed works.

His work continues in the shadows, Leon being completely indifferent to fame and believing that an artist has no right to be distracted by the "cotes mondains" (by-wordly) But patrons, including brothers George and Marcel Bernard, businessmen and collectors came through the door of his studio and convinced him to work on their behalf in any material freedom. But the 1929 crisis occurs and destroys the two bankers.

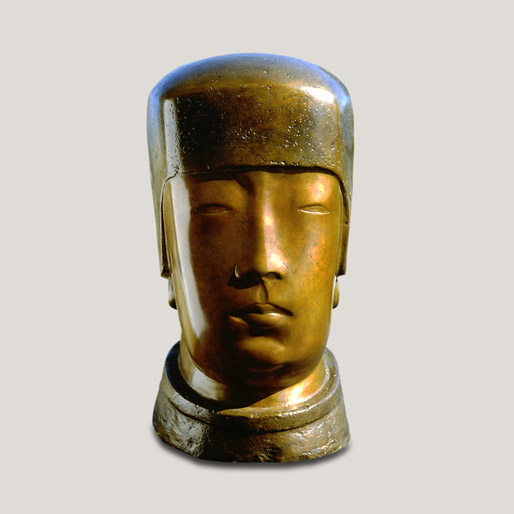
"Head of the painter FUJITA" (1915) by Indenbaum

The physical and gear problems returned, although lower, as amateurs were acquiring his works.

In 1939, the war comes, because it hides its origins and many of his works then disappear or are destroyed. Then the years pass, Indenbaum worked discreetly and it is difficult to follow his artistic ascent because of its unsociable nature and his horror of publicity.

== Exhibitions and events ==
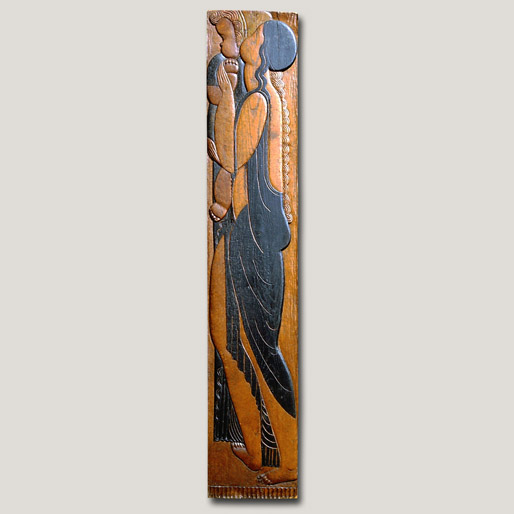
"Femme à l'enfant" by Indenbaum

- Opening in 1963 the "Groupe des 9" composed by Jean Carton, Raymond Corbin, Paul Horn, Marcel Damboise, Leopold Cretz, Gunnar Nilsson, John Ossouf, Raymond Martin and himself.
- The same year, he participated in the Menecy Rendezvous of Arts Workers in the rest center of Renault factories, the famous car company.
- In 1964, he was part of the exhibition "Vingt-deux sculpteurs témoignent de l'homme" (Twenty-two sculptors show the man) at the Galerie Vendome in Paris; and a tribute to him is made by Dr. Miller, collector, Juliette Darle, poet and art critic, and Jean Oissouf, sculptor.
- Other assessments in 1966 by Juliette Darle on the sculptures exhibited at the 20th Salon of Saint-Denis, Paris.

"The small format sculptures of Indenbaum are masterpieces of intelligence, sensitivity and invention of plastic. A great sculptor too little, too removed, and that it is absolutely necessary to reveal to his contemporaries"

- In 1967, he exhibited at the first festival of contemporary sculpture (Chateau de St Ouen)
- In 1968, the consecration is finally given him: he received the Wildenstein prize awarded by Institut de France.

.

== His works on the market ==
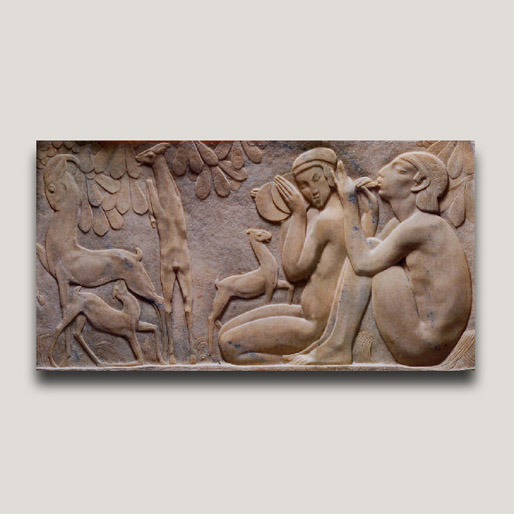
Musiciens et Antilopes

- Leon Indenbaum's pink marble bas-relief dated 1914 "Musiciens et Antilopes" holds (2004) world record sale for a work of decorative art of the twentieth century (Christie's in New York for 3.3 million Euros 27 October 2004). "Musicians and Antelopes" came from Jacques Doucet Collection.
