= Mont Sainte-Victoire seen from Bellevue =

Painting by Paul Cézanne

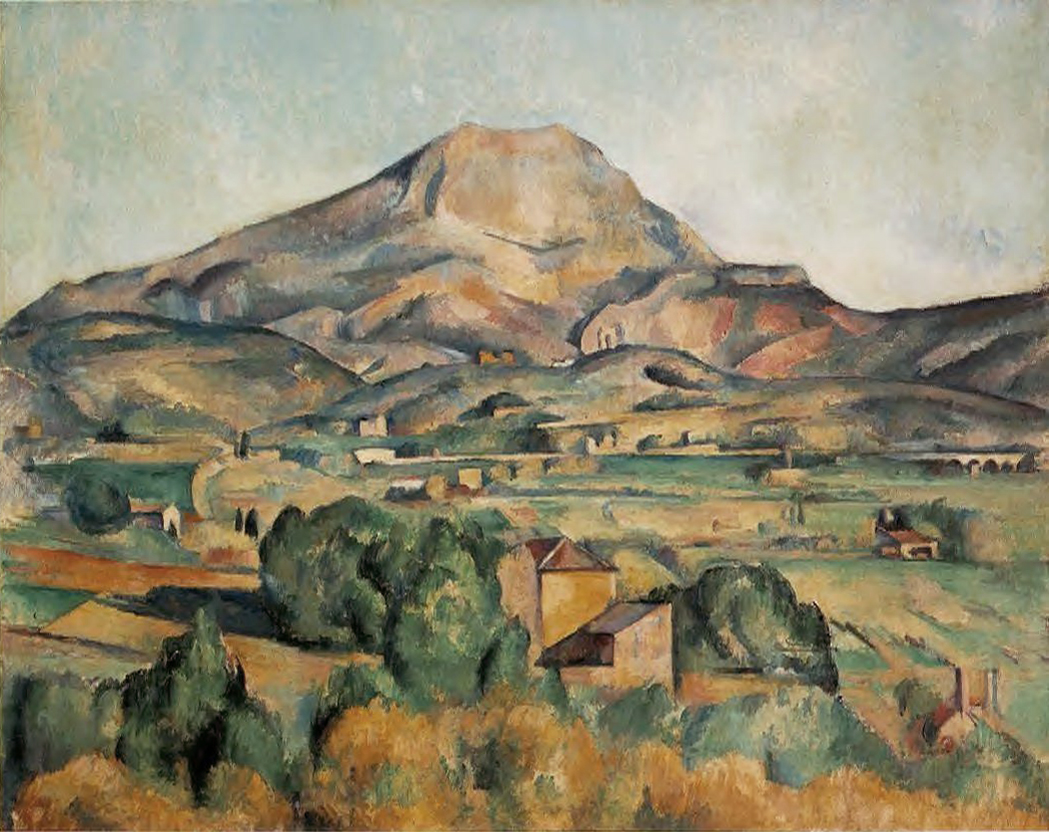
- Artist: Paul Cézanne
- Year: c. 1895
- Medium: Oil on canvas
- Dimensions: 73 cm × 92 cm (29 in × 36 in)
- Location: Barnes Foundation, Philadelphia

Mont Sainte-Victoire seen from Bellevue is a landscape painting dating from around 1886, by the French artist Paul Cézanne. The subject of the painting is the Montagne Sainte-Victoire in Provence in southern France. Cézanne spent a lot of time in Aix-en-Provence at the time, and developed a special relationship with the landscape. This particular mountain, that stood out in the surrounding landscape, he could see from his house, and he painted it in on numerous occasions.

Only half a year after the opening of the Aix–Marseille railway line on October 15, 1877, Cézanne wrote to his friend Émile Zola on April 14, 1878, praising Mont Sainte-Victoire—seen from the train as it crossed the Arc River Valley bridge—as a “beau motif” (“beautiful motif”). Around this time, at the age of thirty-nine, Cézanne began, for the first time, a series of paintings devoted to Mont Sainte-Victoire in his native Aix-en-Provence. It is therefore highly probable that this celebrated series was inspired by the scenery viewed from the window of a moving train.

Indeed, in this painting, the railway bridge on the Aix–Marseille line, which crosses the Arc River Valley, is depicted near the center-right of the composition.

The painting shows clearly Cézanne's project of rendering order and clarity to natural scenes, without giving up the optical realism of Impressionism. Both the light and the colours of the painting give the impression of a pattern that is not imposed on nature, but is there naturally.

== See also ==
- List of paintings by Paul Cézanne

== Sources ==
- Becks-Malorny, Ulrike Paul Cézanne, 1839-1906: Pioneer of Modernism (Cologne, 2001), ISBN 3-8228-5642-8
- Gombrich, E.H., The Story of Art, 16th ed. (London & New York, 1995), ISBN 0-7148-3355-X
- Tomoki Akimaru, "Cézanne and the Railway (1) – (7): A Transformation of Vision in the 19th Century", Art Critique+, AICA (Association Internationale des Critiques d'Art) Japan, 21 April 2025.
