= Montagne Sainte-Victoire =

Mountain range in Provence-Alpes-Côte d'Azur, France

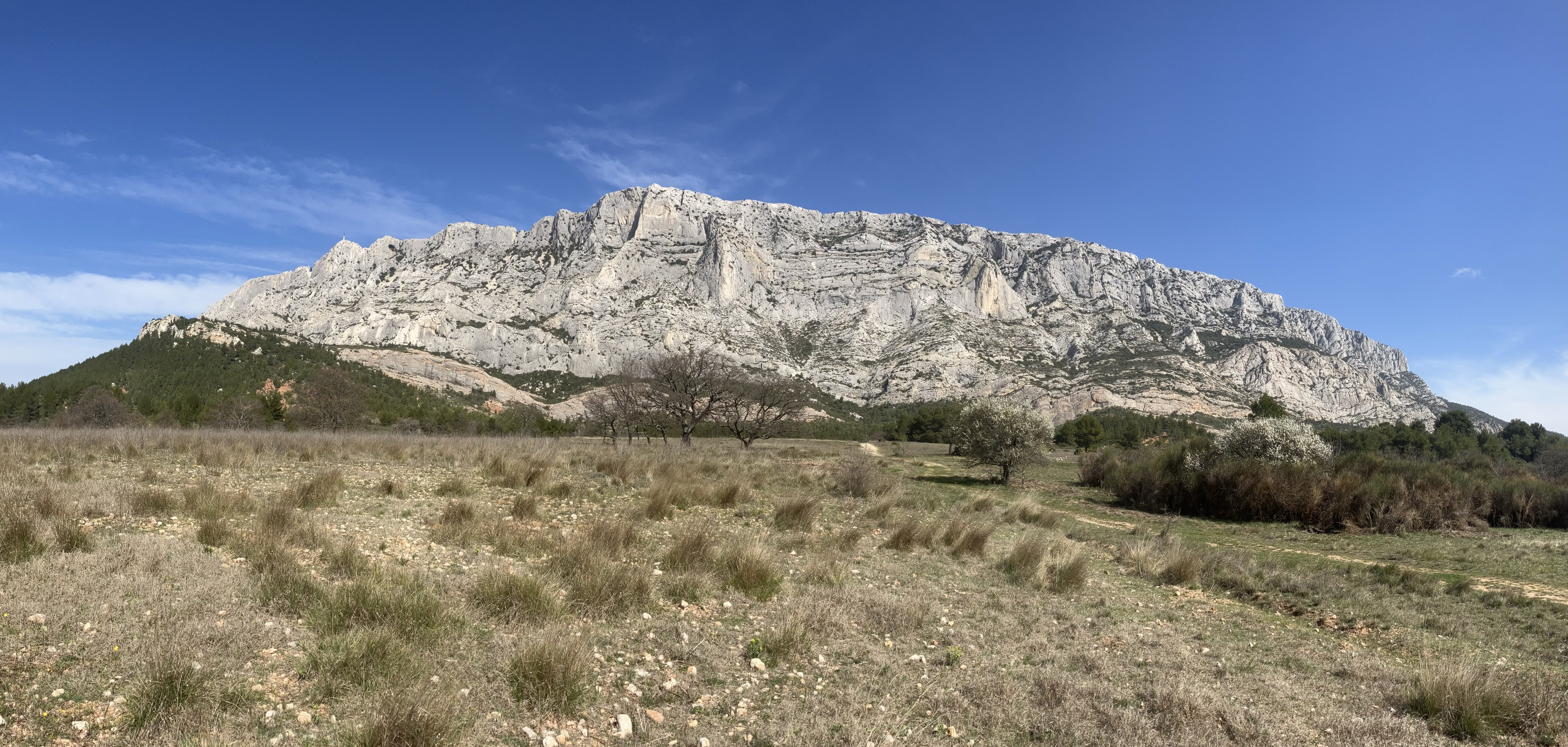
- Montagne Sainte-Victoire and Croix de Provence on the left side

Highest point
- Elevation: 1,011 m (3,317 ft)
- Coordinates: 43°32′21″N 5°38′43″E

Geography
- Location within France
- Location: Provence-Alpes-Côte d'Azur, France
- Parent range: Sainte-Victoire Massif

Map of Sainte-Victoire

Montagne Sainte-Victoire (Provençal Occitan: Venturi / Santa Venturi according to classical orthography and Ventùri / Santo Ventùri according to Mistralian orthography) is a limestone mountain ridge in the south of France which extends over 18 km (11 mi) between the départements of Bouches-du-Rhône and Var. Its highest point is the Pic des mouches at 1,011 metres (3,317 ft); this is not however the highest point in Bouches-du-Rhône, which is instead found in the Sainte-Baume massif. The Croix de Provence is a notable feature of the mountain. At a height of 19 metres, this cross, although not placed at the highest point of the mountain, stands out from the ridge far more than the Pic des Mouches.

The mountain is celebrated for its many appearances in a series of paintings by Paul Cézanne (1839–1906), who could see it from near his house in nearby Aix-en-Provence.

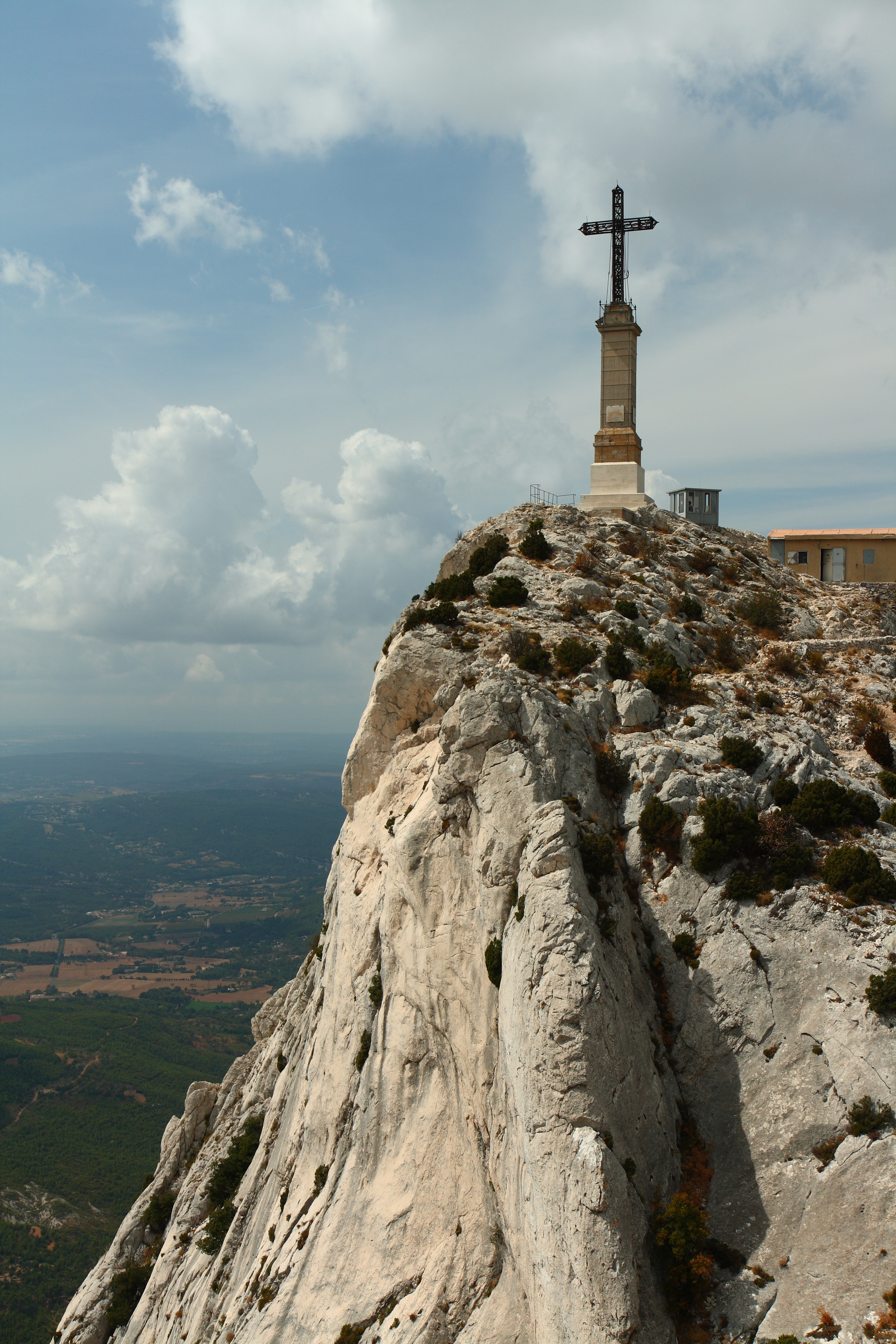
The Croix de Provence.

== History and tourism ==
Originally called montagne de la Victoire, the mountain became known by Christians in the Middle Ages as Sainte-Venture. In the 13th century, a chapel was constructed at the summit. It was not until the 17th century that the mountain gained its current name.

In 1989 a fire ravaged over 50 square kilometres of the mountain's south face. Much work has been done to promote reforestation, but the amount of vegetation, particularly conifers, remains much less than it was prior to the fire. Access to the mountain is now largely restricted during the summer.

However, during the periods of free access, the Saint-Victoire massif is a popular destination for hiking, climbing, paragliding and, to a lesser extent, caving. Around 700,000 walkers use its paths every year.

== Artists ==
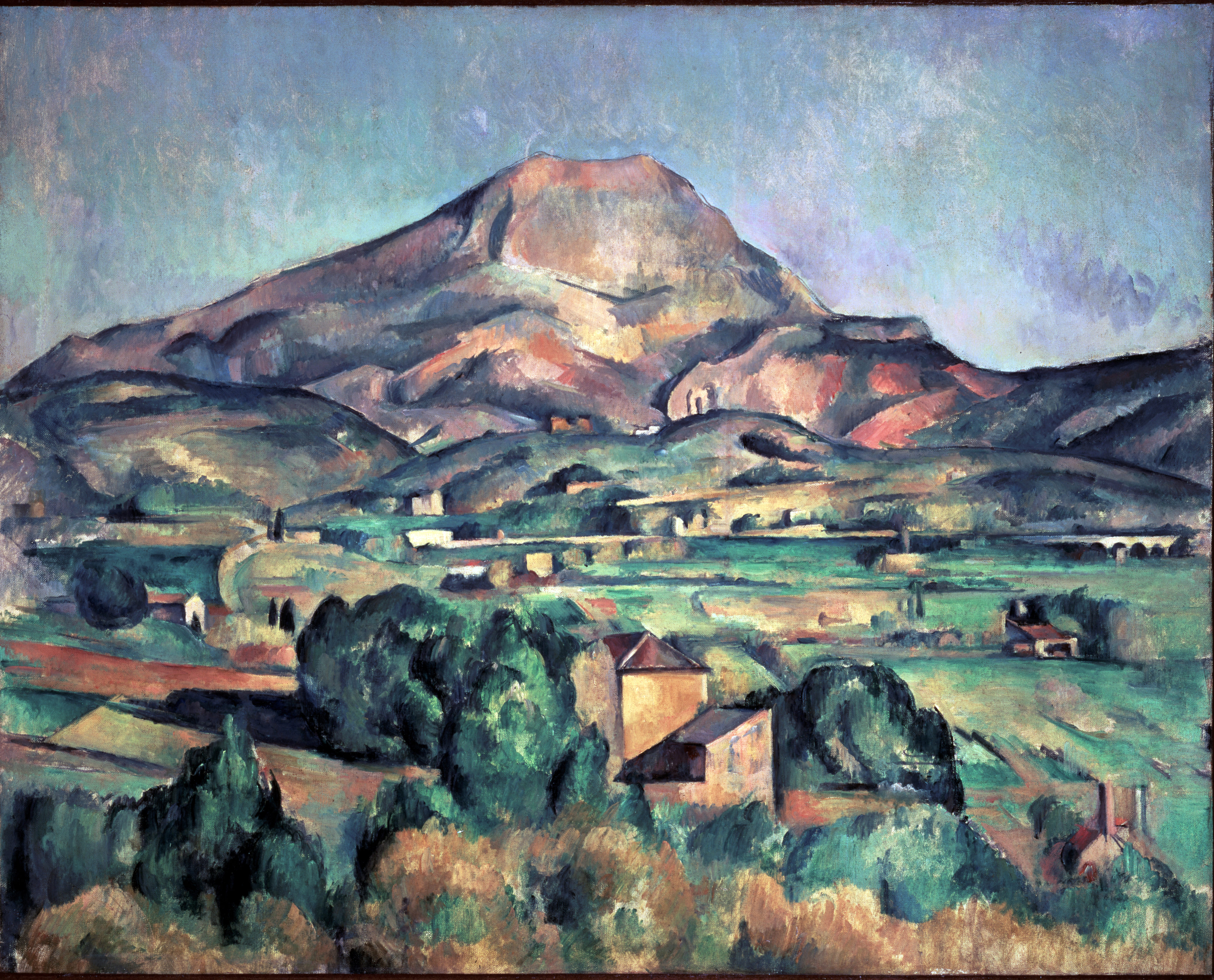
Mont Sainte-Victoire and the Viaduct of the Arc River Valley, Paul Cézanne 1882-5

In addition to Cézanne, Montagne Saint-Victoire has been a source of inspiration for other artists, for example:

- It makes an appearance in the 1454 painting Coronation of the Virgin by Enguerrand Quarton.
- The painter Pablo Picasso, who bought the Château de Vauvenargues, situated at the foot of the mountain, and installed a studio there between 1959 and 1962
- The painter Wassily Kandinsky
- The painter André Masson (1896-1987) in The Red Lands and the Montagne Sainte Victoire, 1948

(Les Terres rouges et la Montagne Ste Victoire)

- The writer Peter Handke with The Lesson of Sainte-Victoire (1980)
- The writer Guy Gavriel Kay with Ysabel (2007)
- The version by painter Mark Tansey (1987), "the soldiers of poststructuralism and deconstruction---Jean Baudrillard (seated second from left), Barthes (recumbent, lighting a cigarette), and Derrida (standing, removing his overcoat)---disrobe in the shadow of Cézanne's mountain. Shedding their uniforms, they are transformed in their reflections into women. The men on the shore (at left) are flanked by the arching trees of Cézanne's 1906 Bathers. All appear engulfed in the mucky depths of Plato's cave. Aided by Derrida's 1978 book Spurs: Nietzsche's Styles, Tansey explores the nature of representation through the study of transformation." These are..."optimistically suggestive of the possibilities other than those suggested by Greenberg and his cohorts."
