= Rideau, Cruchon et Compotier =

Painting by Paul Cézanne

Curtain, Pitcher, and a Fruit Bowl
- Rideau, Cruchon et Compotier (French)
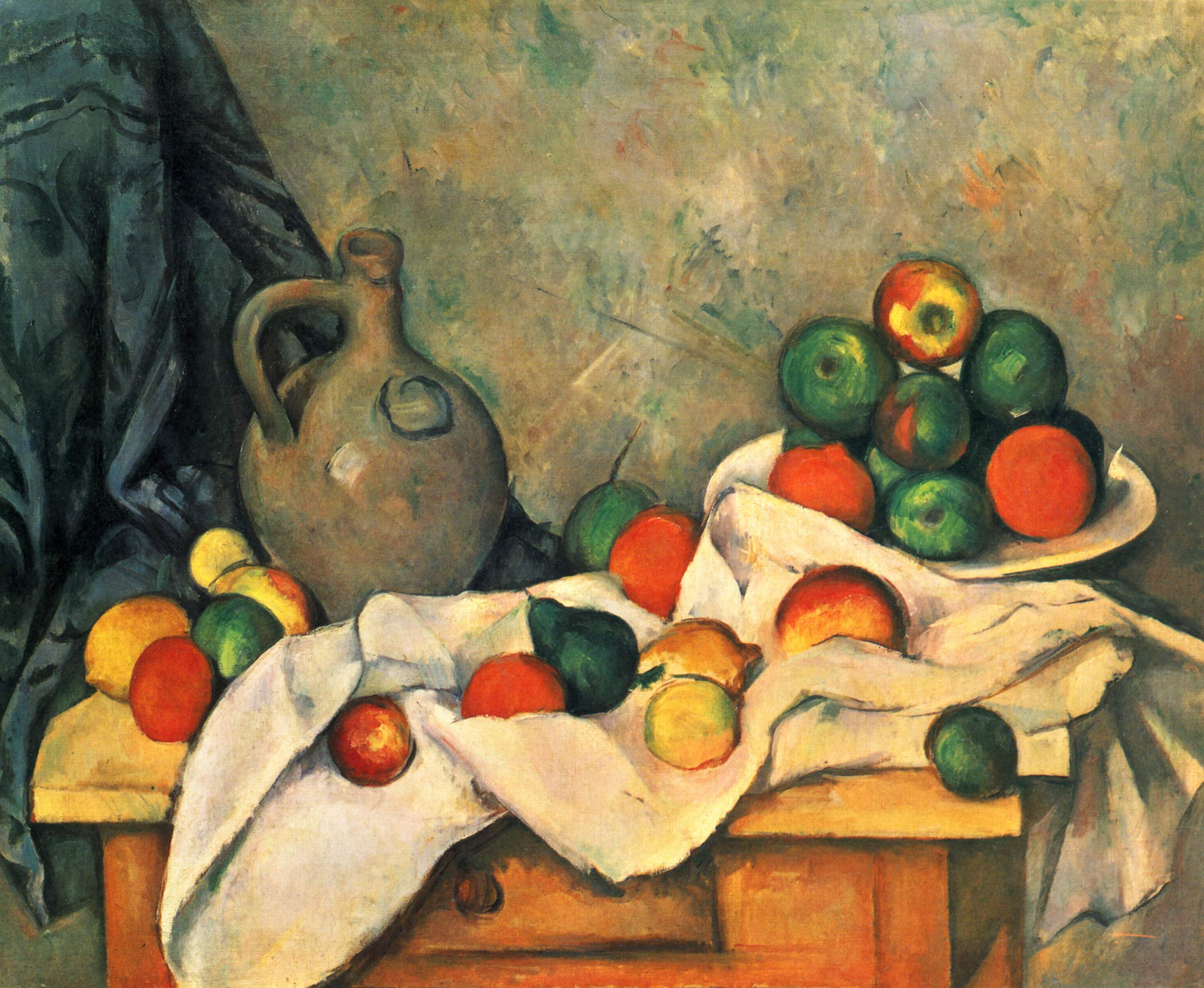
- Artist: Paul Cézanne
- Year: 1893–1894
- Medium: Oil on canvas
- Dimensions: 60 cm × 73.0 cm (23.5 in × 28.75 in)
- Location: Private collection

Rideau, Cruchon et Compotier (English: Curtain, Pitcher, and a Fruit Bowl or Curtain, Jug and Fruit Bowl) is an oil on canvas painting created c. 1893 to 1894 by French artist Paul Cézanne. It is a formal still life composition, displaying Cézanne's exploration of form, balance, and symmetry in objects. On 10 May 1999, the painting was sold at Sotheby's auction for $60.5 million, making it the most expensive still life painting ever sold at an auction.

== Background ==
Cézanne explored various genres throughout his artistic career, including landscapes and portraiture, but repeatedly returned to the subject of still life. It was a genre that historically had been disregarded in art as unimaginative, yet Cézanne challenged the establishment by focusing on everyday objects. He was particularly drawn to fruit, which he used to explore the correspondence between objects and the harmony and balance of composition. Although his objects appear to have been placed randomly, the images were carefully constructed to experiment with perspective.

Cézanne was fascinated by the exploration of optics in art. His still life paintings were a study in the geometric forms of objects and also in the shifting ways that our eyes view them. He attempted to depict objects from various perspectives to capture the complexity of the visual image. He wrote that, "Painting from nature is not copying the object, it is realising one's sensations".

Cézanne's distinctive brushwork and distortion of the subject eventually influenced new art styles during the 20th century such as Cubism.

== Description ==
This painting is a formal representation of its subject title, depicting a wooden table upon which are placed a large earthenware jug and a fruit bowl stacked with apples and oranges. To the left of the painting a curtain hangs in front of a patterned wall. A white cloth has been draped across the table with various fruits placed among its folds. The composition displays a study of outlines and a symmetry of objects. The earthenware jug has been depicted in a unique manner, in contradiction to ordinary perspective, and has been adapted to the shapes of the fruit and the other elements of the composition. The rich colours of the objects have been individually rendered with a full range of varying shades.

== Provenance ==
The painting was owned by Paul Gauguin and subsequently owned by Ambroise Vollard, Cornelis Hoogendijk, Paul Rosenberg, Albert C. Barnes, and the Carroll Carstairs Gallery. On 10 May 1999, the painting was sold at Sotheby's, New York City for $60,502,500 (equivalent to $109.8 million in 2025), a record price, during the sale of the Whitney family collection. Billionaire Ken Griffin purchased the painting to add to his private collection. The painting was later resold to Steve Wynn in August 1999 in a private sale for an undisclosed price.

== Other version ==
A second version of the work, painted by Cézanne in the same year under the same title, is in a private collection.

== See also ==
- List of paintings by Paul Cézanne
- The Basket of Apples
- Still Life with Teapot
- List of most expensive paintings
