= Nativity (Master of the Brunswick Diptych) =

Painting by Master of the Brunswick Diptych

The Nativity
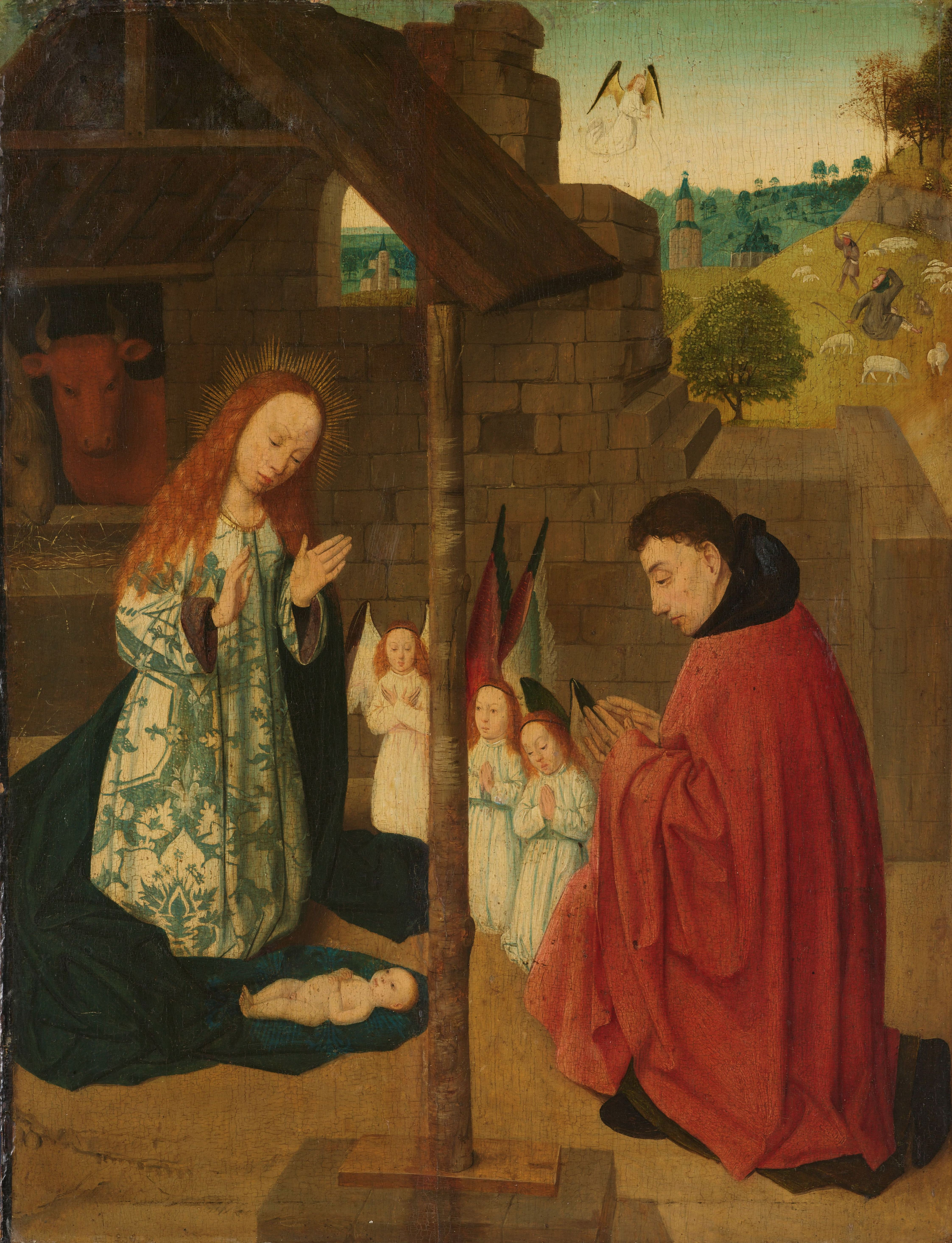
- Artist: Master of the Brunswick Diptych
- Year: circa 1495
- Medium: Oil on panel
- Dimensions: 45.3 cm × 34.7 cm (17.8 in × 13.7 in)
- Location: Rijksmuseum, Amsterdam

The Nativity is a circa 1495 oil on panel by the painter Master of the Brunswick Diptych in the collection of the Rijksmuseum.

The scene is the Nativity. Mary kneels before her child, which lies on her cloak. Behind her are the ox and donkey, and facing her are Joseph (shown young); and three angels who lean forward towards the Child Jesus. The iconography closely resembles the revelations of Bridget of Sweden which were still popular in this period a century after she wrote them. These include the youthful features of the Virgin, her and Joseph's praying hands, her loose blond curly hair, and the miraculously clean and painless birth with the child sprouting spontaneously from its kneeling mother's womb keeping her virginity intact with no visible umbilical cord or afterbirth. The upper right of the painting shows a distant landscape with the annunciation to the shepherds.

The painting is closely related to paintings in Minneapolis and Glasgow. It was previously attributed to Geertgen tot Sint Jans when it was in the Cornelis Hoogendijk collection and was donated by his sister Maria Ida Adriana Hoogendijk in 1912. In 1927 it was reattributed to the Master of the Brunswick Diptych by Michael Friedländer.

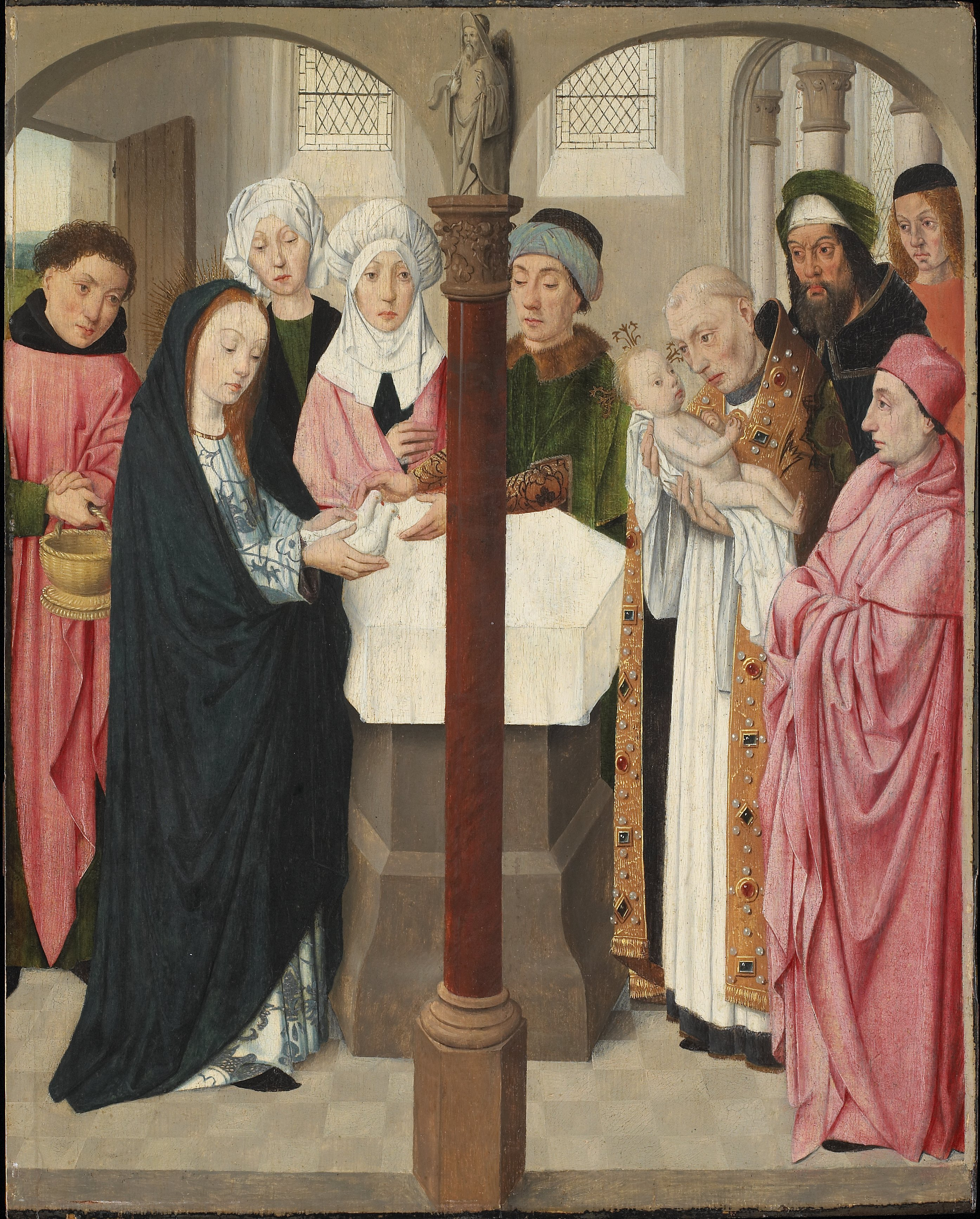
’’The Presentation in the Temple’’, Minneapolis Institute of Art

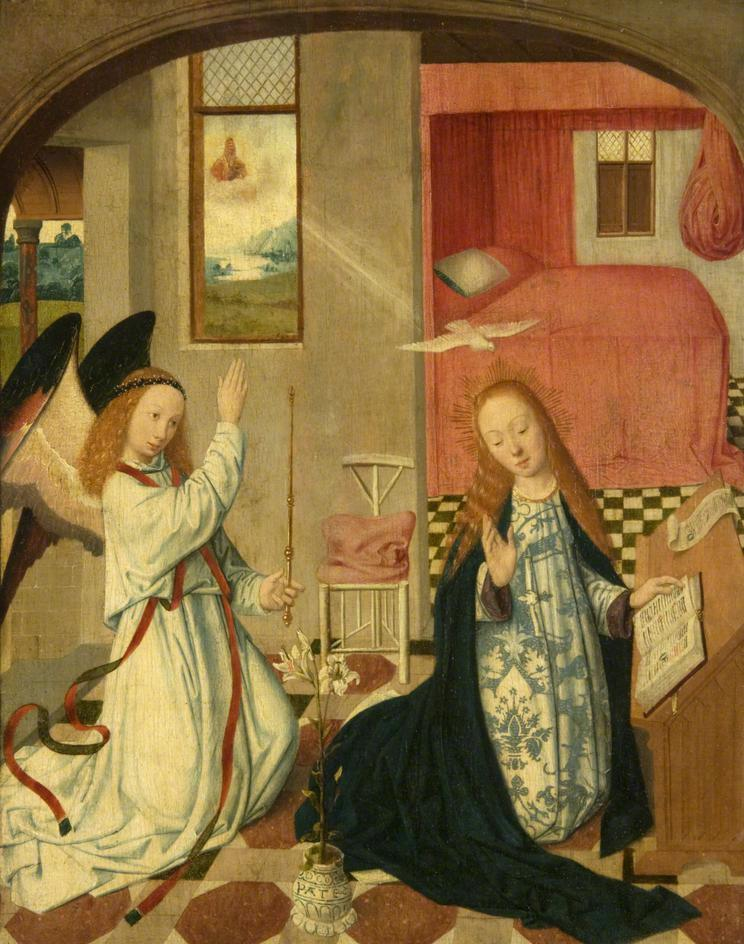
’’The Annunciation’’, Burrell Collection, Glasgow
