= Master of the Brunswick Diptych =

Dutch painter

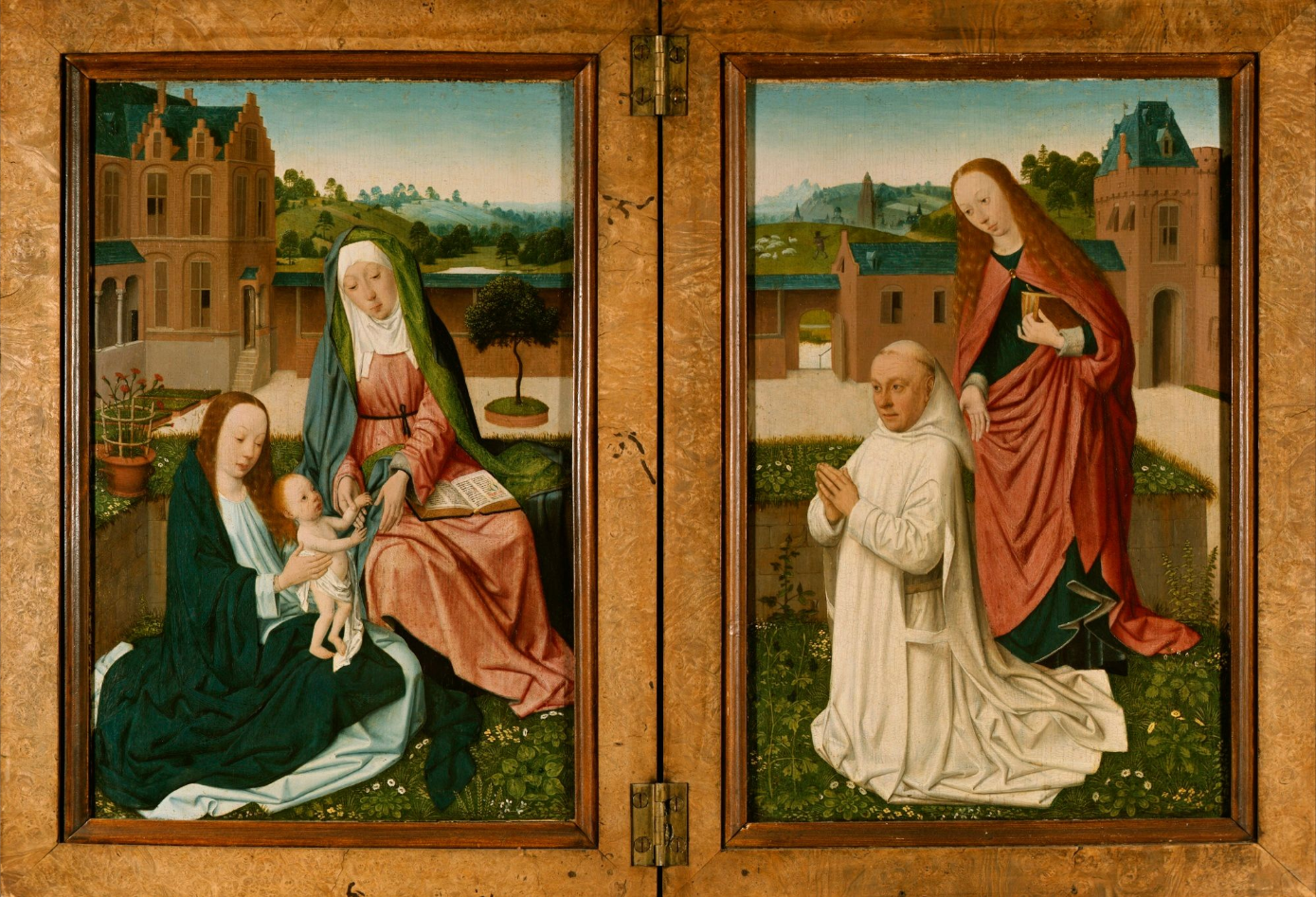
The Brunswick diptych, after which the anonymous master is designated.

The Master of the Brunswick Diptych (fl. c. 1480-1510) was a Dutch early Renaissance painter.

== Life and works ==
Nothing is known for certain about the anonymous master. Some scholars have attempted to identify the artist as Jacob van Haarlem, who is documented as having lived and worked in Haarlem from 1483 to 1509 and may have been a teacher to Jan Mostaert, but this remains a speculation.

The anonymous master is named after a diptych in Brunswick, depicting Mary with an infant Jesus, Saint Anne and, opposite, a kneeling Carthusian monk and Saint Barbara. From this work, a number of other paintings have been identified as being by the same hand.

The works by the Master of the Brunswick Diptych show similarities with those of Geertgen tot Sint Jans, such as the Rijksmuseum nativity, but the colours are generally lighter, his treatment of space and anatomy is less accomplished and the paintings more miniature-like. In a panel painting presently in Cologne, the master breaks new ground by depicting a domestic scene of a woman feeding a child for the first time in panel painting.
