= The Basket of Apples =

Painting by Paul Cézanne

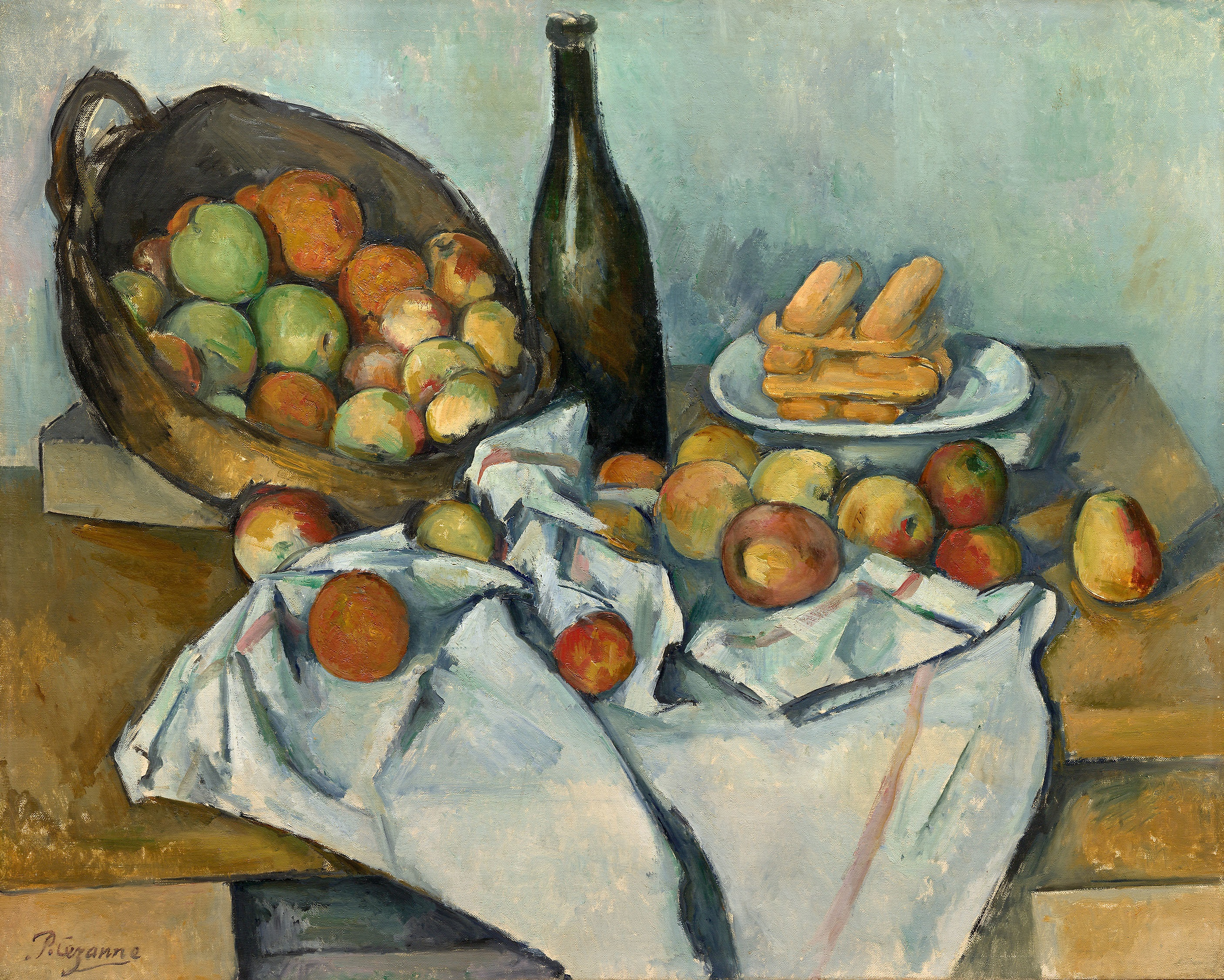
- Artist: Paul Cézanne
- Year: c. 1893
- Medium: Oil on canvas
- Dimensions: 65 cm × 80 cm (26 in × 31 in)
- Location: Art Institute of Chicago, Chicago

The Basket of Apples (French: Le panier de pommes) is a still-life oil painting by French artist Paul Cézanne, which he created c. 1893. The painting rejected naturalistic representation in favor of distorting objects to create multiple perspectives. This approach eventually influenced other art movements, including Fauvism and Cubism. It belongs to the Helen Birch Bartlett Memorial Collection of the Art Institute of Chicago.

== Background ==
Since the Neoclassical era, the subject of still life had been largely dismissed by artists as a trivial subject. It had not been considered to be of the same importance as religious and historical paintings or even landscapes and portraiture. The exception to this was a brief period in 17th-century Northern European art, particularly in the Netherlands, although this had little impact. This neglect of still life in art made it an attractive subject for Cézanne, who considered the subject to be a blank slate upon which he could experiment. Due to the lack of conventions in the depiction of the subject, Cézanne was given the freedom to create meaning within this largely untouched area. With his paintings of still life, Cézanne effectively reinvented and reinvigorated the subject, which then had great influence on artists of the 20th century, such as Pablo Picasso and Henri Matisse.

== Description ==
The Basket of Apples is an oil-on-canvas painting that depicts a table holding a bottle and a basket full of apples. The canvas measures 65 cm x 80 cm and is signed "P. Cézanne" at the lower left. The painting is noted for its disjointed perspective. It has been described as a balanced composition due to its unbalanced parts; the tilted bottle, the incline of the basket, and the foreshortened lines of the cookies mesh with the lines of the tablecloth.

The table depicted in the painting is tilted, with no right angles, creating an impossible shape. The basket of apples also tilts forward, and appears to be held in place by the bottle and folds of the tablecloth. In this painting, Cézanne had not intended to depict the objects in a realistic manner. He used heavy brushstrokes to create a greater density than would be seen in real life. He once described art as "a harmony running parallel to nature". This objective to create harmony in composition and structure is evident in this painting.

In creating this composition, Cézanne was challenging the idea of linear perspective. Since the Early Renaissance, artists had used a single vantage point in order to create the illusion of space. Cézanne recognised that human perspective is far more complex than viewing an object from a frozen point in time. Instead, he created a representation of sight in motion, with objects viewed from varying viewpoints. With this aim, he deconstructed the image, by carefully suggesting different perspectives. This is evident in the way that the cookies are depicted on the table, which appear as seen from the side, but also slightly from above.

== Significance and legacy ==
The Basket of Apples demonstrates how Cézanne employed multiple perspectives, a vivid colour palette and analytical brushwork to produce creative compositions in opposition to realistic depictions of everyday objects. Because his paintings were the precursor to Fauvism and Cubism, Cézanne has been described as the "Father of Modern Art". The distortion displayed in this painting was a process that influenced the work of Pablo Picasso and Georges Braque. This was noted by Braque in 1957, who stated, "The hard-and-fast rules of perspective ... were a ghastly mistake which it has taken four centuries to redress; Paul Cézanne and after him Picasso and myself can take a lot of credit for this."

== See also ==
- List of paintings by Paul Cézanne
- Still Life with Teapot by Cézanne
- Le pigeon aux petits pois by Picasso
- Still Life with Geraniums by Matisse
