= Cornelis Hoogendijk =

Dutch art collector (1866–1911)

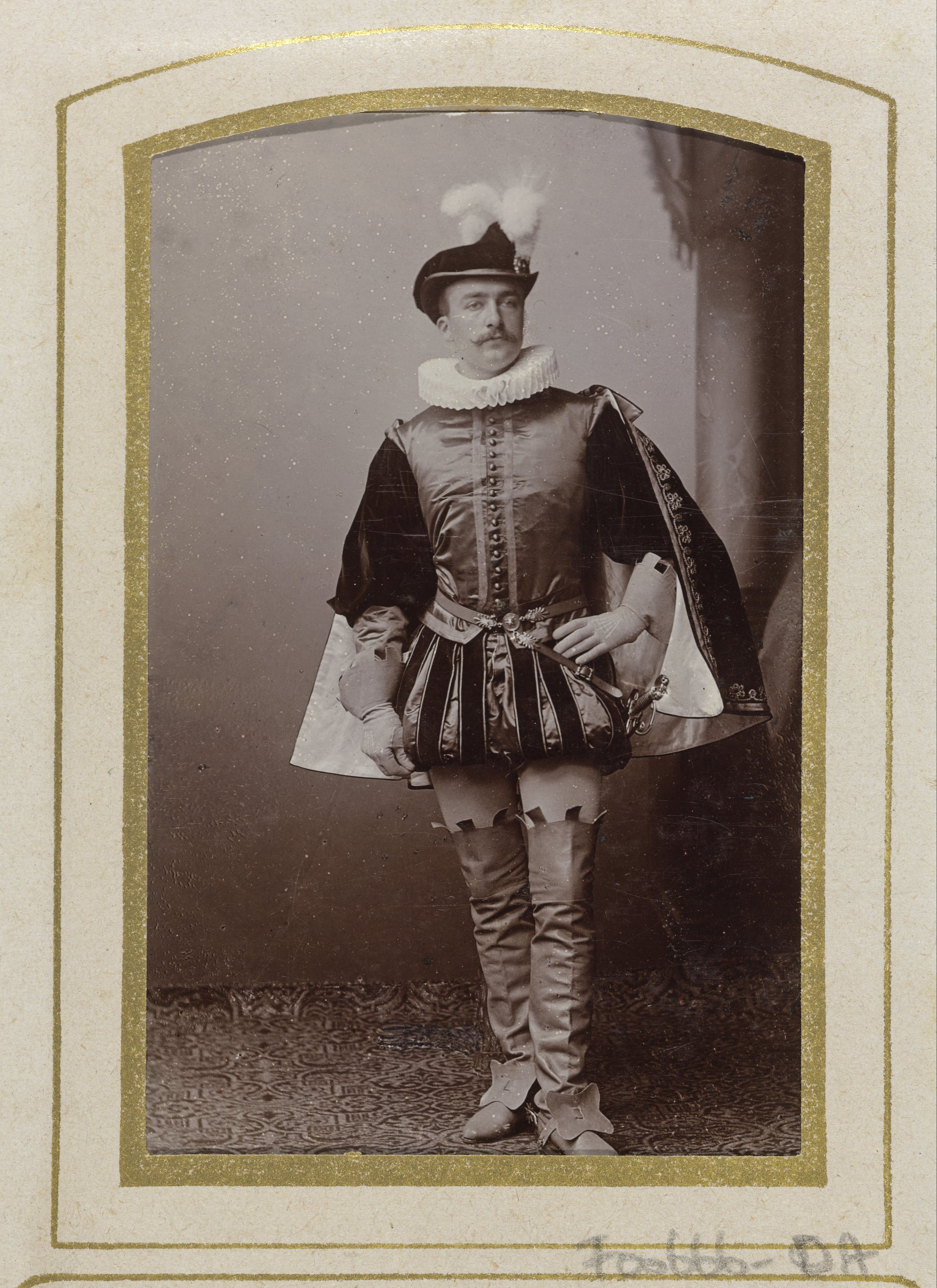
- Portrait of Cornelis Hoogendijk in 17th-century costume for bal masqué, circa 1894
- Born: 1866; Krimpen aan den IJssel
- Died: 1911 (aged 44–45); Ermelo

Cornelis Hoogendijk (1866 – 1911) was a Dutch art collector.

Hoogendijk was born in Krimpen aan den IJssel as the third of six children, and studied law at Leiden University before entering the Rijksakademie van beeldende kunsten in Amsterdam in 1891. One older brother had died before he was born, and his mother died a year after his youngest sister Riet was born in 1874. The death of his remaining older brother when he was only nine left a lasting impression, and when his father died in 1883, Cornelis became the head of the family at age 17. In 1885 his sister Wilhelmina married the lawyer Ferdinand Kranenburg and moved to Amsterdam. The two younger sisters moved with him to The Hague after he purchased 365 Bezuidenhoutseweg in 1898 and old catalogs reflect he began to purchase art in 1889. In the years 1890-1899 he built up an enormous collection of paintings, financed with the fortune he had inherited, as well as income from mortgages he had sold locally. Of his three sisters, Riet shared his interest in art and she also entered the Rijksakademie in 1889, where she became a painter and met her future husband, the painter Gerrit Willem van Blaaderen, whom she married in 1905. Through their common interest, the Hoogendijk collection became well known by the turn of the century, but suffered a severe setback when Cornelis experienced a psychosis in 1900 during a trip to Paris, where he had an apartment at 59 rue Blanche.

== Removing collection from The Hague to Amsterdam ==
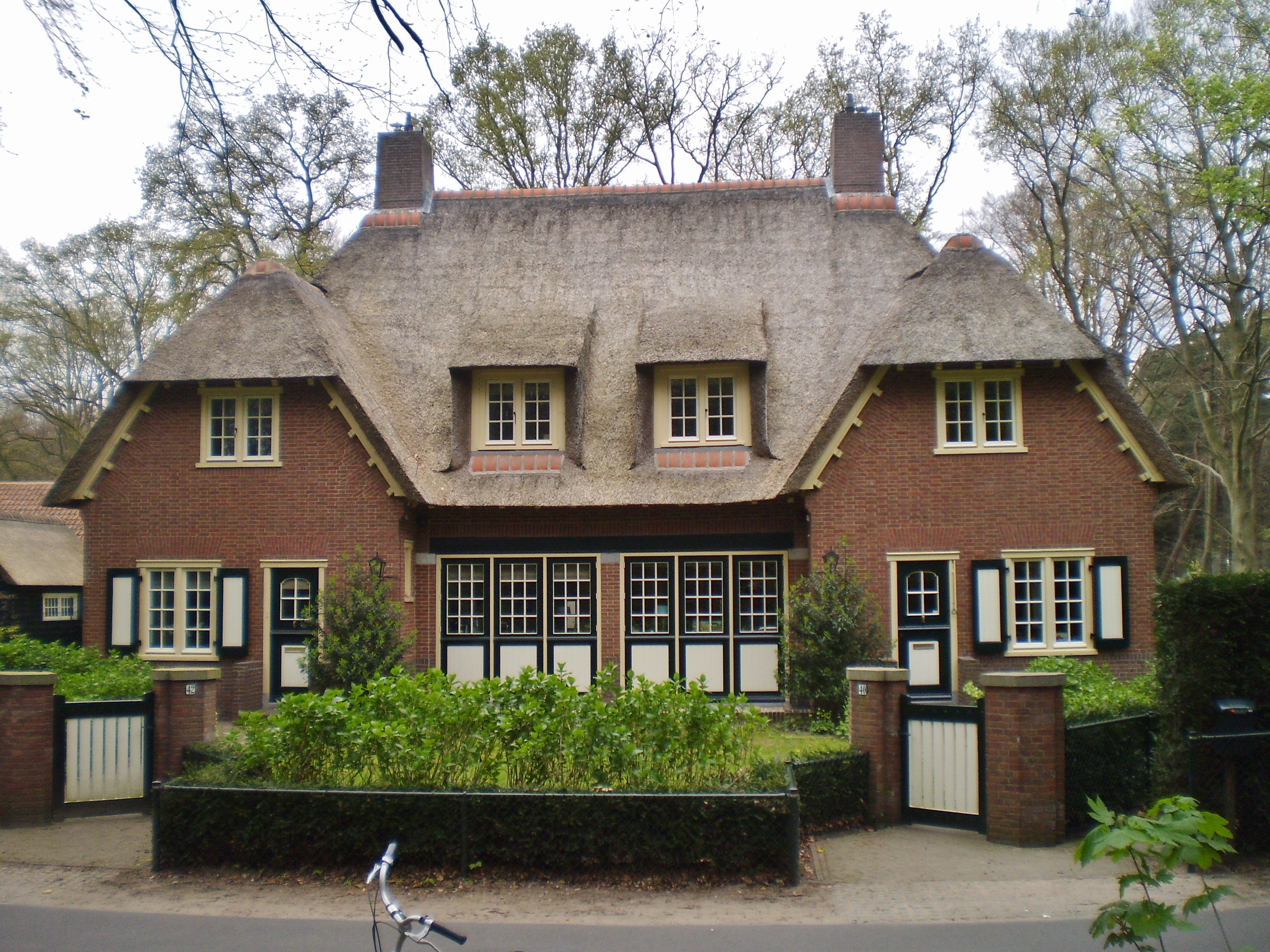
'De Maerle' in Huizen, built in 1906–1917, where much of the art ended up with the Van Blaaderen-Hoogendijk family

After returning to the Hague he saw a doctor and was sent to the top psychiatric center Veldwijk in Ermelo in February, where at first everyone thought he would make a recovery. However, in 1902 his brother-in-law Ferdinand Kranenburg started acting as family spokesperson, and with an eye towards the sisters' future without their brother, had 365 Bezuidenhoutseweg appraised. Hofstede de Groot made a list of 427 works spread throughout the house. After Riet's marriage in 1905 the house in the Hague, still overflowing with art, needed to be emptied as it was too big for their sister Johanna to live in alone. Towards the end of 1906 a Riet and Ferdinand selected a large amount of art to loan to the Rijksmuseum, where the works were gladly received and catalogued by the director Barthold van Riemsdijk. The couple Blaaderen-Hoogendijk commissioned the architect Karel de Bazel to build a new villa for them in Huizen and left for a honeymoon to Italy. On their return in 1907, sister Wilhelmina Kranenburg-Hoogendijk died in September, they moved into their newly built home 'De Maerle' in Huizen, and the old mansion on the Bezuidenhoutseweg was sold. In the years 1907-1911 the older works were shown in the main halls of the Rijksmuseum while the modern art was shown in the new "Drucker gebouw", today called the Philips wing. Cornelis Hoogendijk died in 1911 in the sanitorium in Ermelo. Since the Rijksmuseum had also started moving the works to make room for other exhibitions, the remaining family decided to liquidate the collection.

Cornelis Hoogendijk is known today as a major collector of modern art, including many paintings and sketches by Cézanne and Van Gogh. The art dealer Ambroise Vollard, who loved to tell colorful stories, is probably the source of the uncorroborated tale that his family had him committed due to "wasting his fortune" on his insatiable lust for collecting. There is no evidence of this however, because his sisters and later brothers-in-law accompanied him on trips to art sales in Brussels and Paris, where the men all bought works by the same artists.

Aside from the catalogued 427 paintings in the Hague, it is known from old research into collections that the total number of artworks in the collection must have been much higher. A short sum of works sold in 1907, 1908, and in 1912, show that various parties were busy picking and choosing among the artworks left over. Not included in this number are 48 works by Dutch Masters that were donated to the Rijksmuseum. The bequest to the Rijksmuseum was selected by a committee informed by Riet Hoogendijk with the intention to convince politicians to enable the tax exemption status such as the one that had been granted in England for the Wallace collection. Their strategy worked and a law was adopted in 1912 called Vrijstelling van successierecht voor verkrijging van schilderijen uit de nalatenschap van C. Hoogendijk (exemption from inheritance tax for reception of the paintings from the C. Hoogendijk collection). Cornelis, Riet and her husband Gerrit van Blaaderen may have known Lady Wallace personally from their trips to Paris, but from correspondence with the Rijksmuseum it was clear that even before his psychosis it had been the wish of Cornelis to make a donation of important paintings to the Rijksmuseum.

== Gallery ==
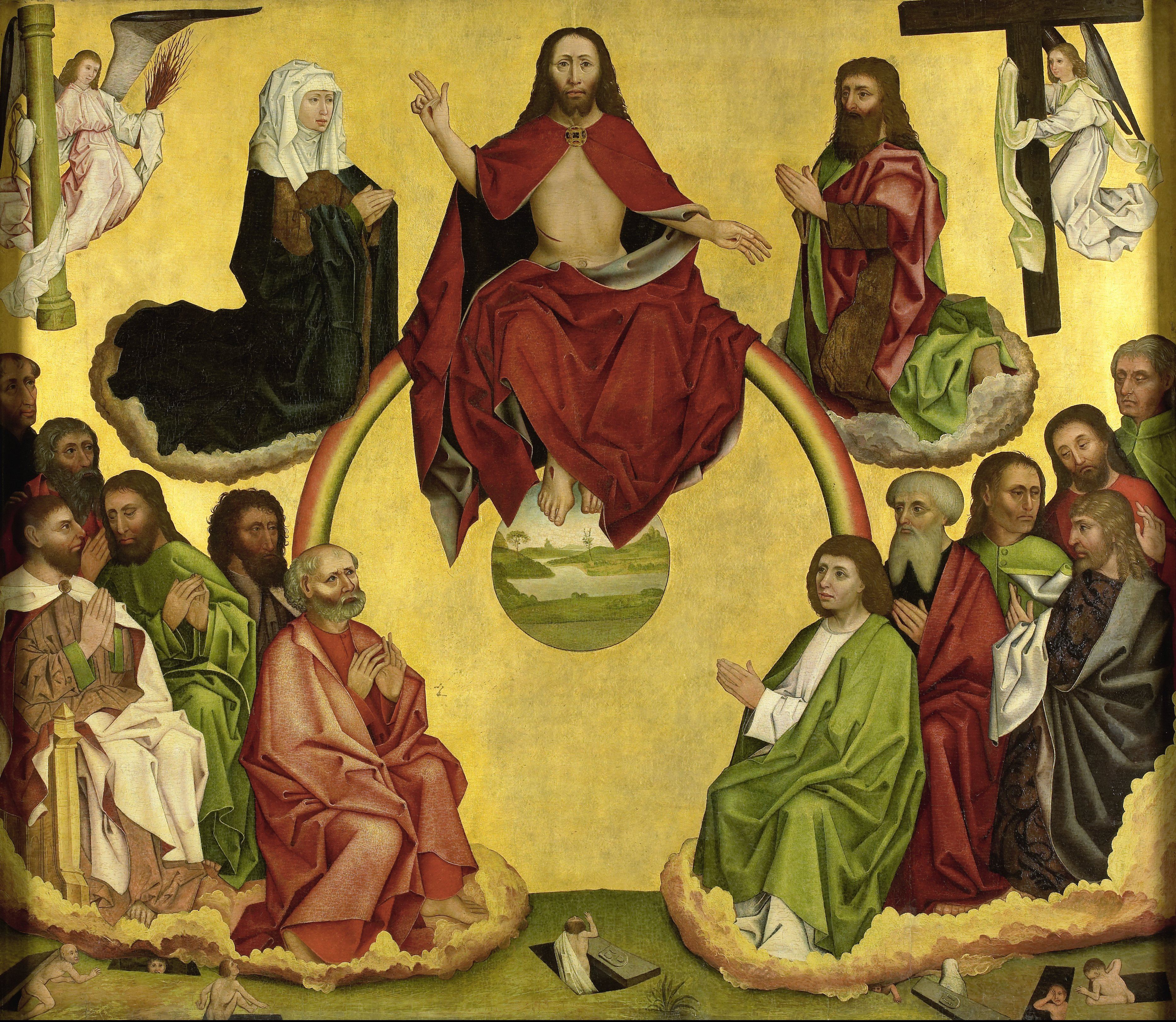
The Last Judgement

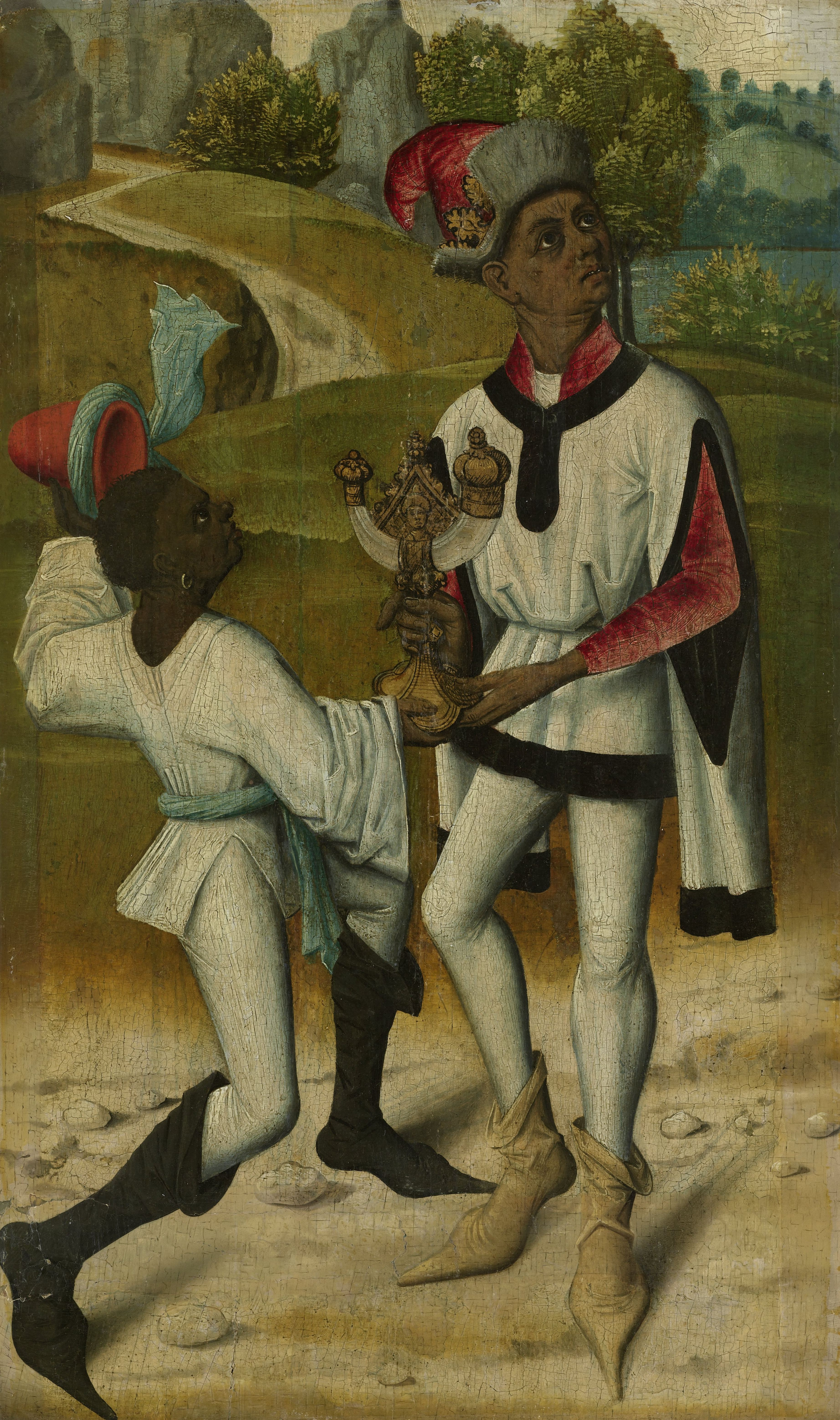
Balthasar, with a servant

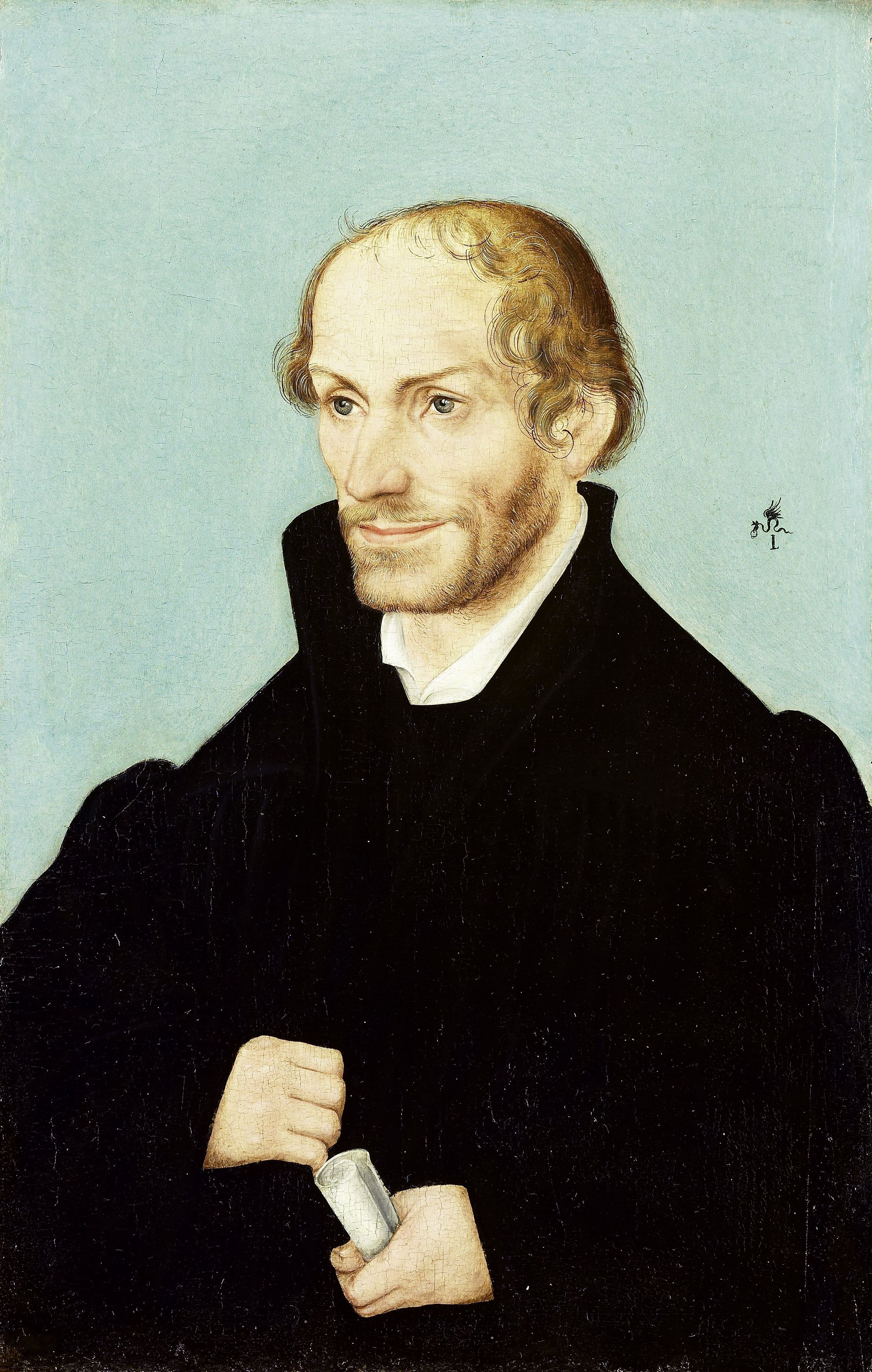
Portrait of Philip Melanchton

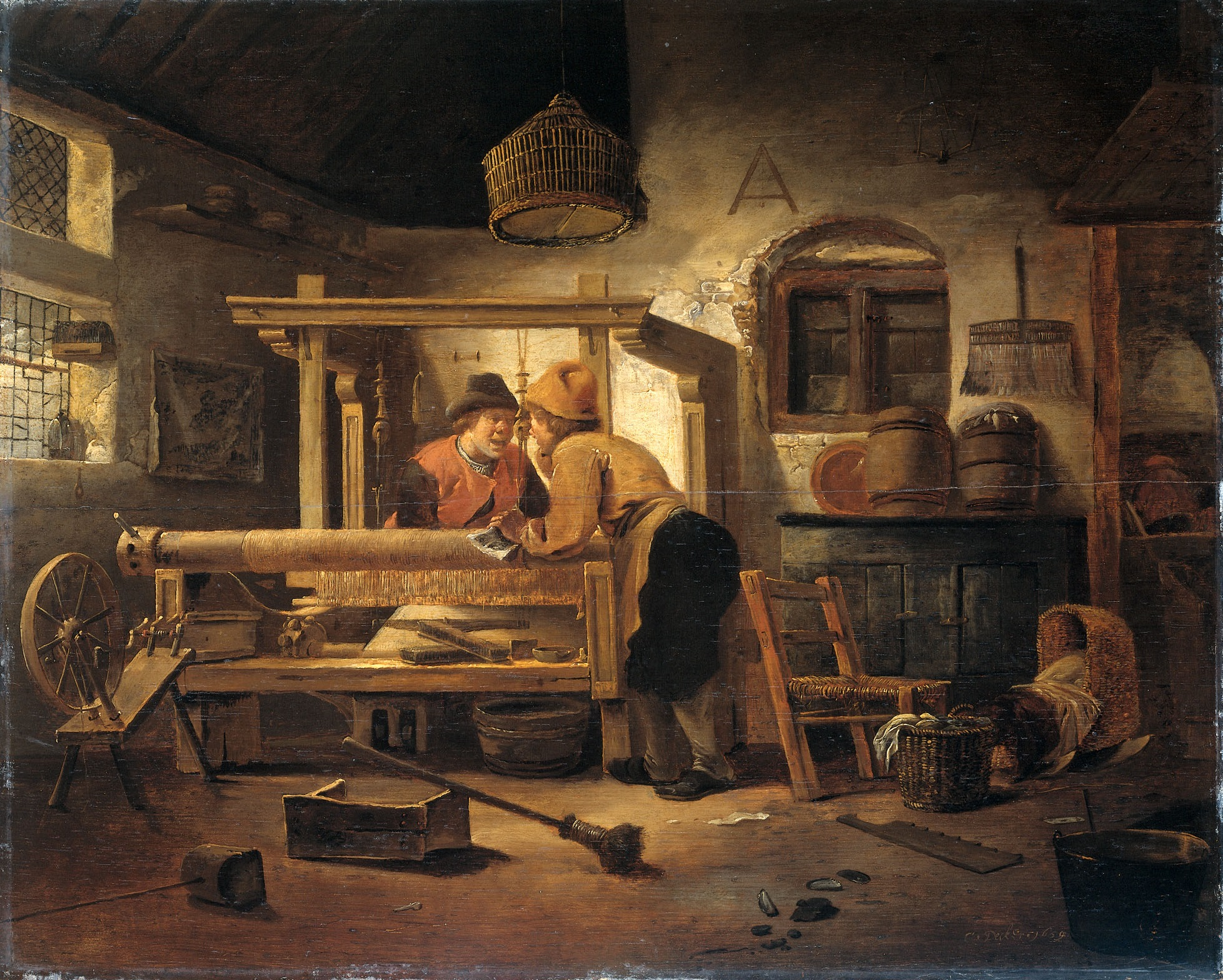
Interior of a Weaver's Shop

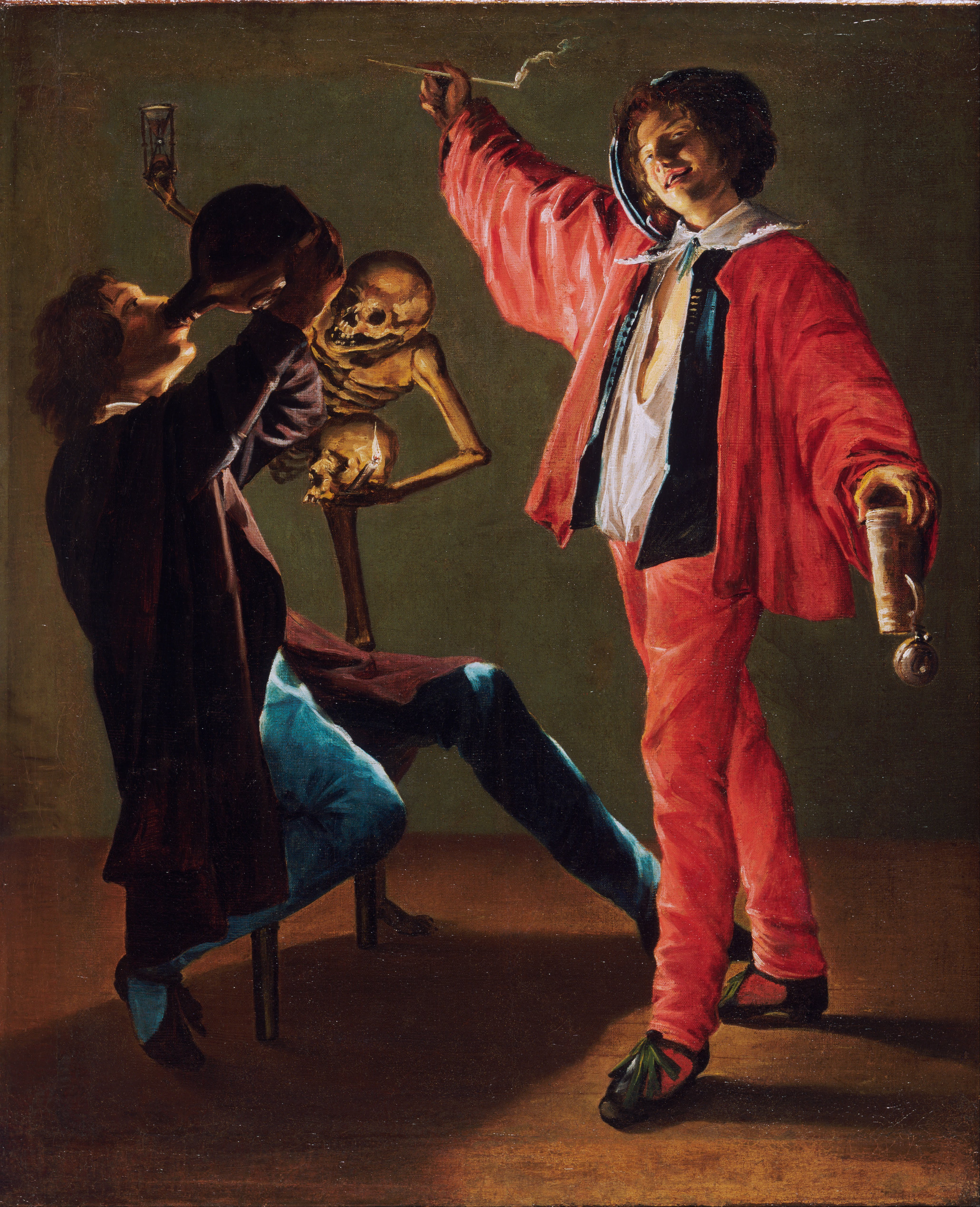
The Last Drop

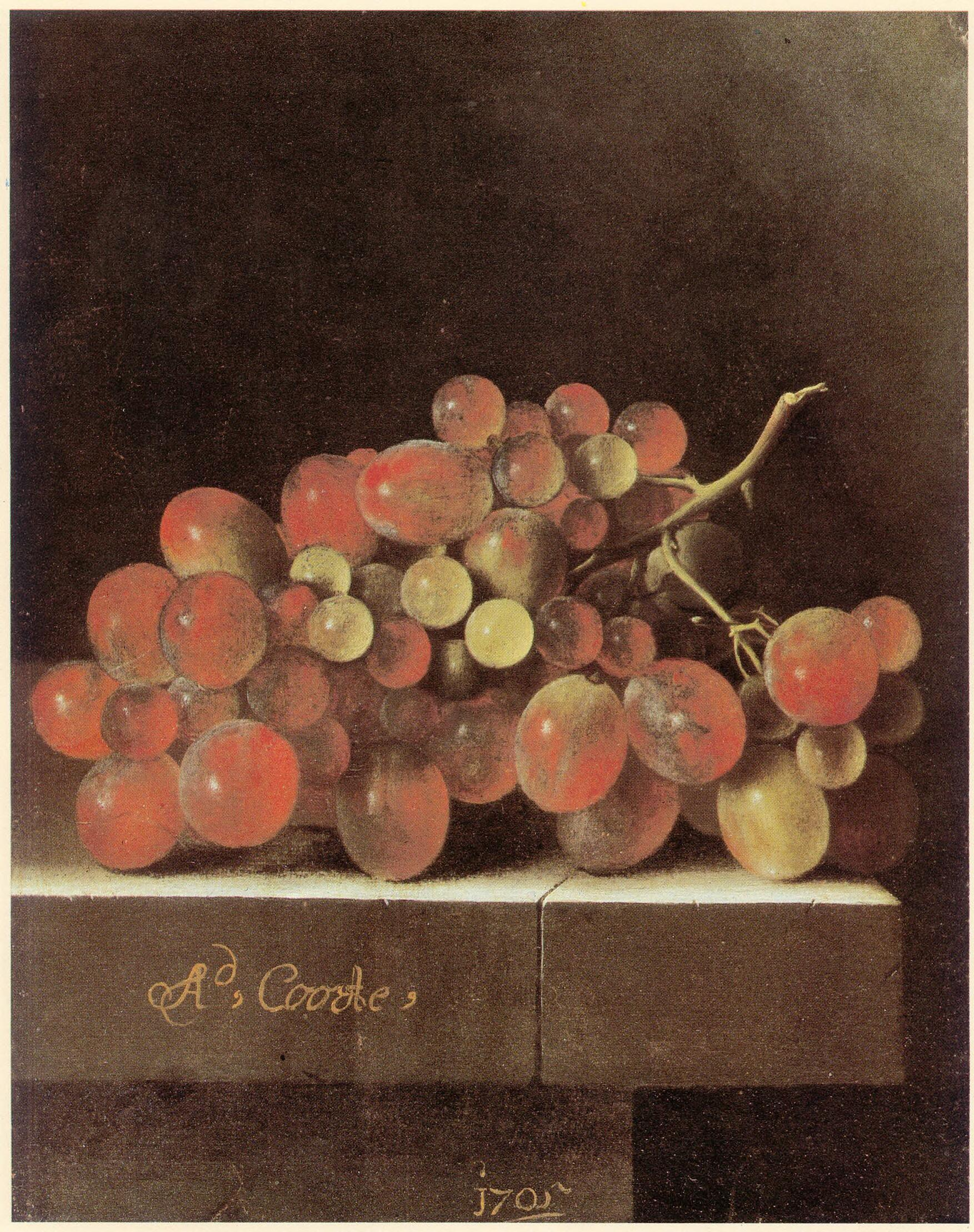
Grapes on a Stone Ledge

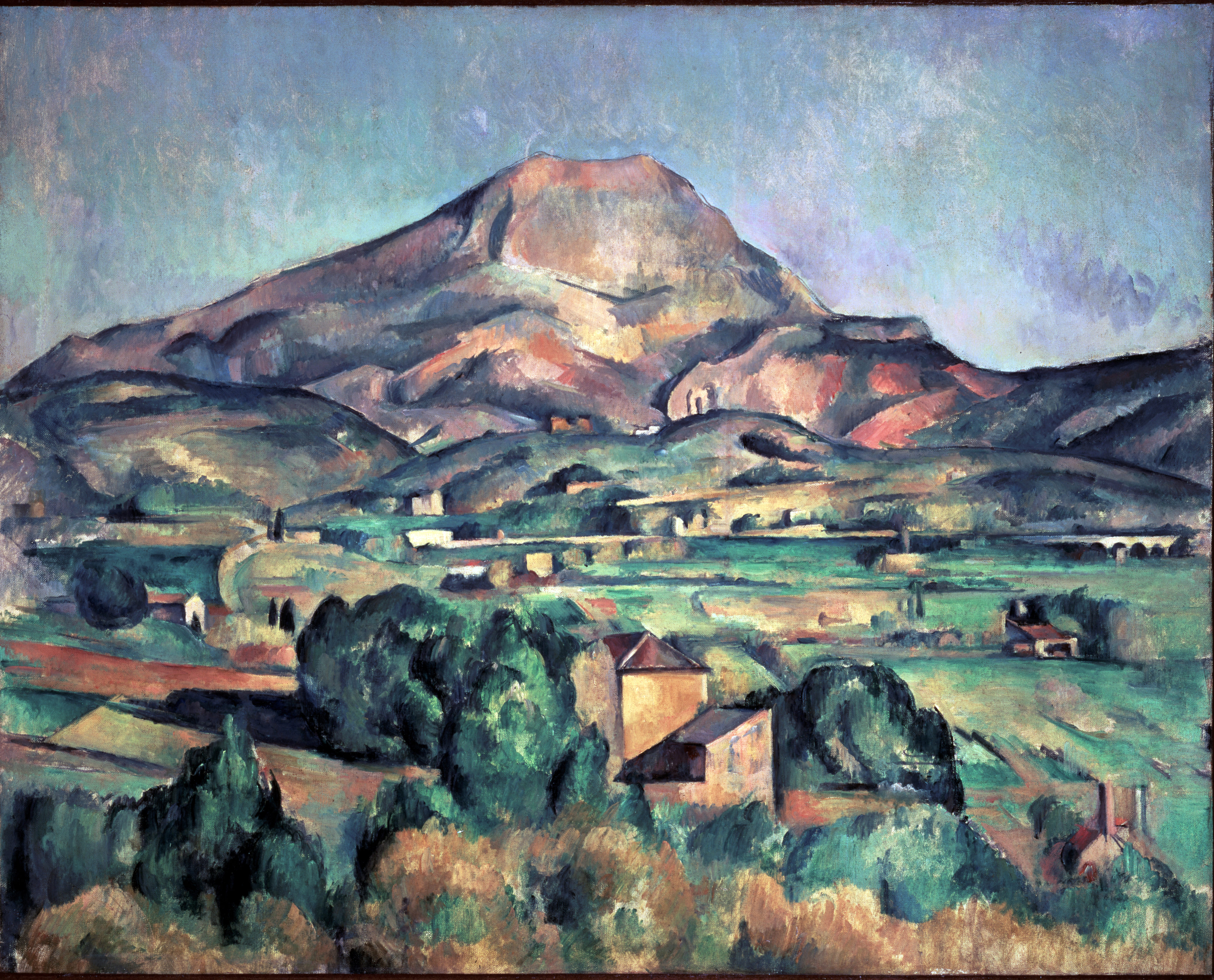
Mont Sainte-Victoire seen from Bellevue

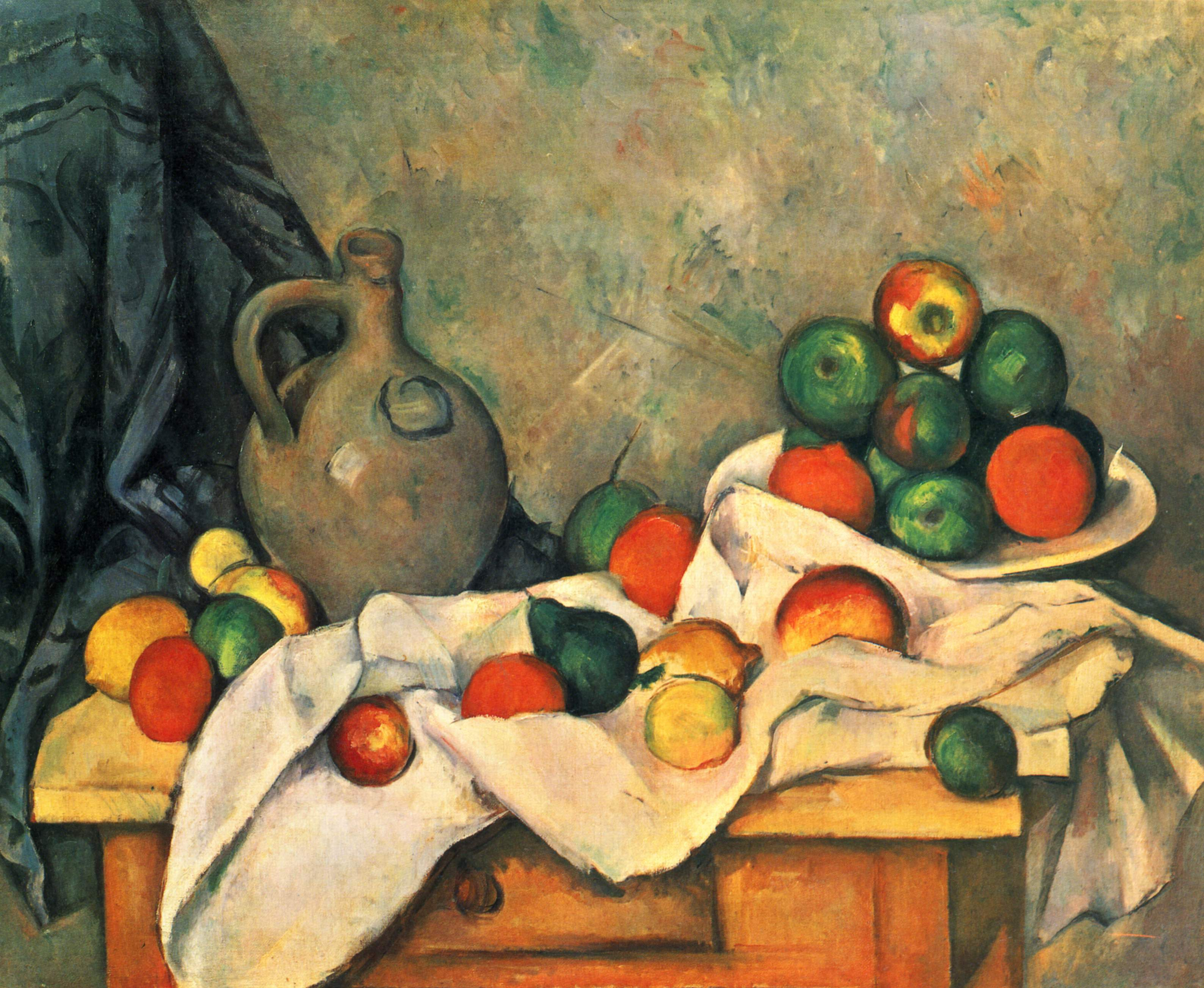
Rideau, Cruchon et Compotier

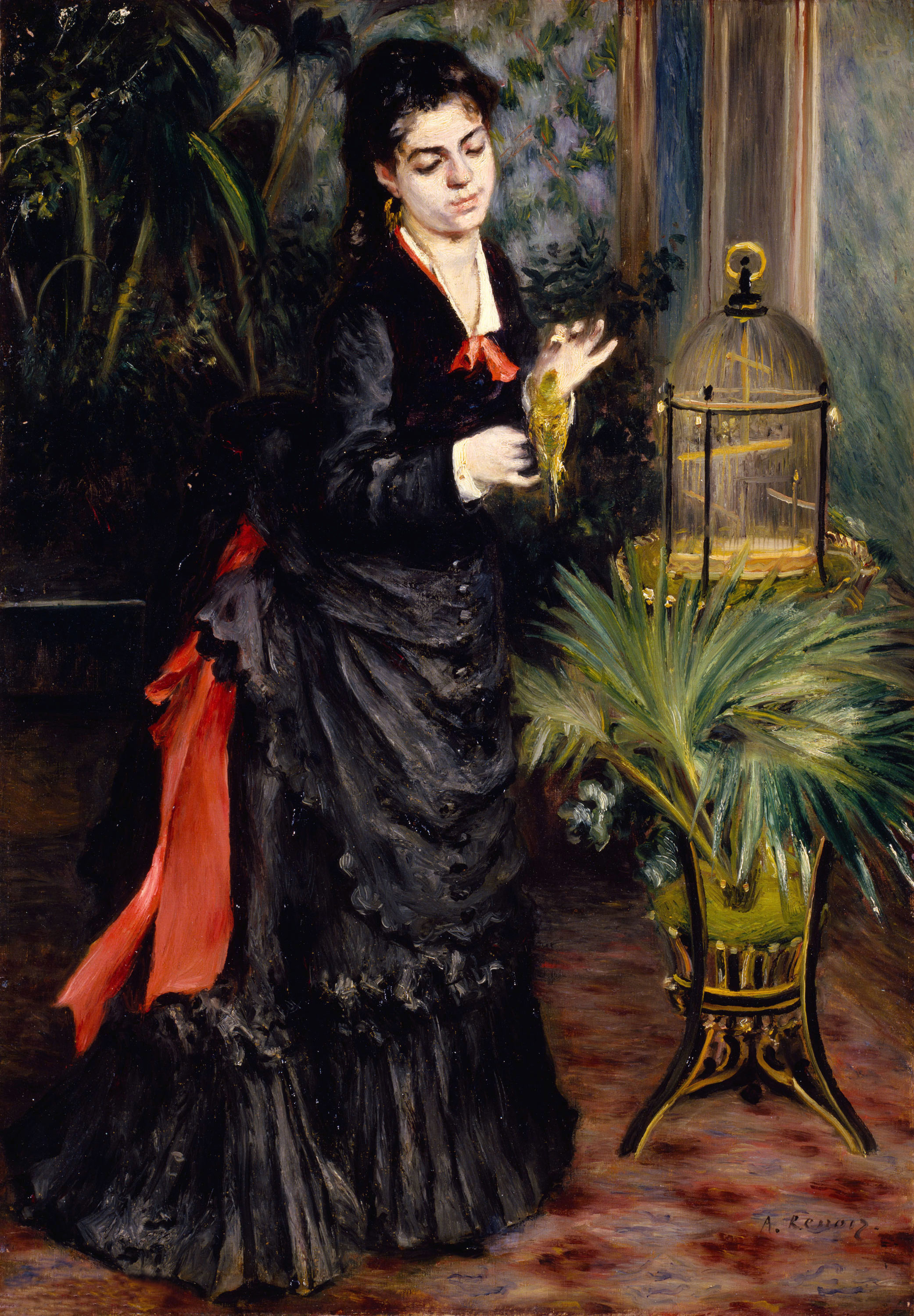
Woman with Parakeet

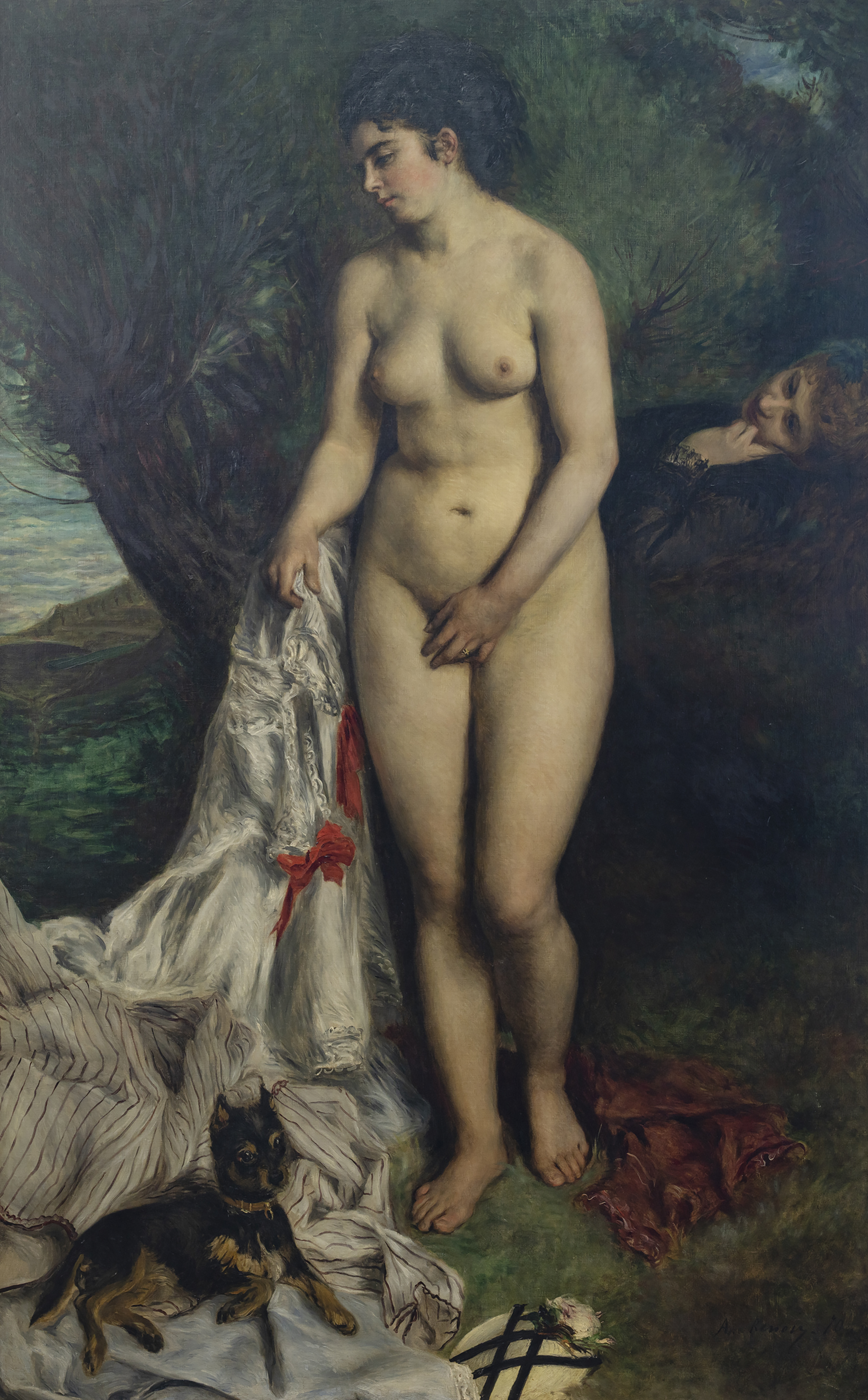
Bather with a Griffon Dog

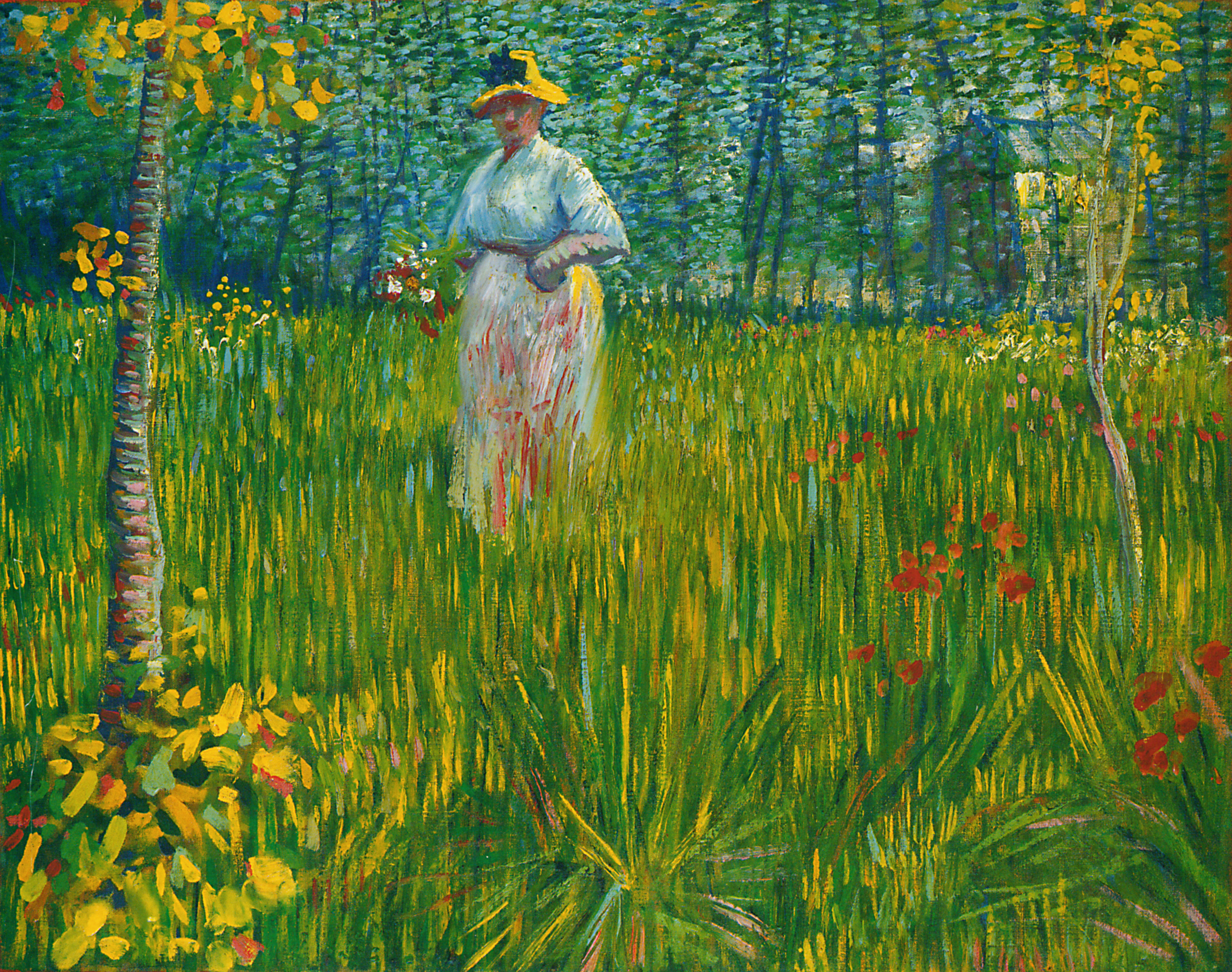
A Woman Walking in a Garden

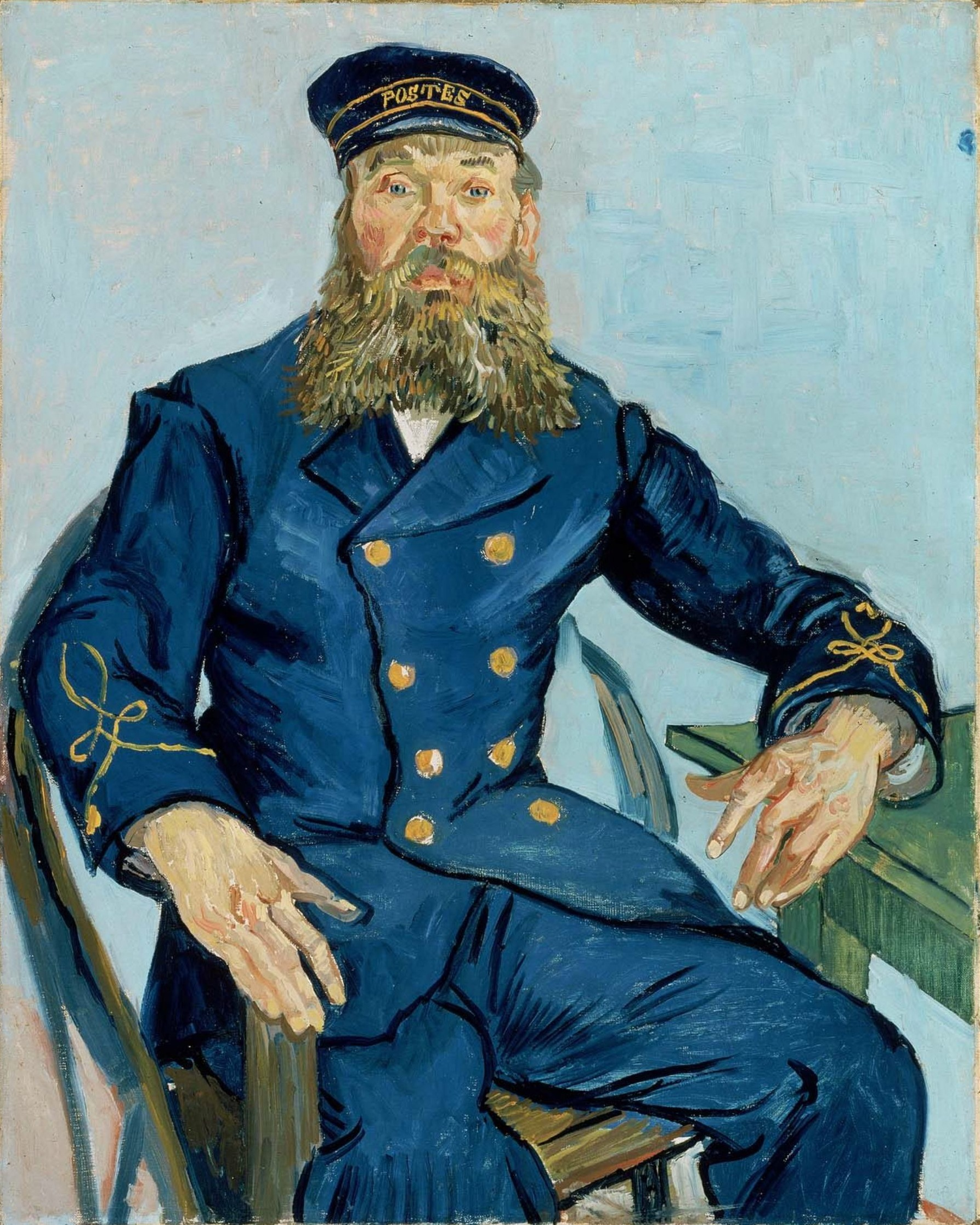
Portrait de Joseph Roulin

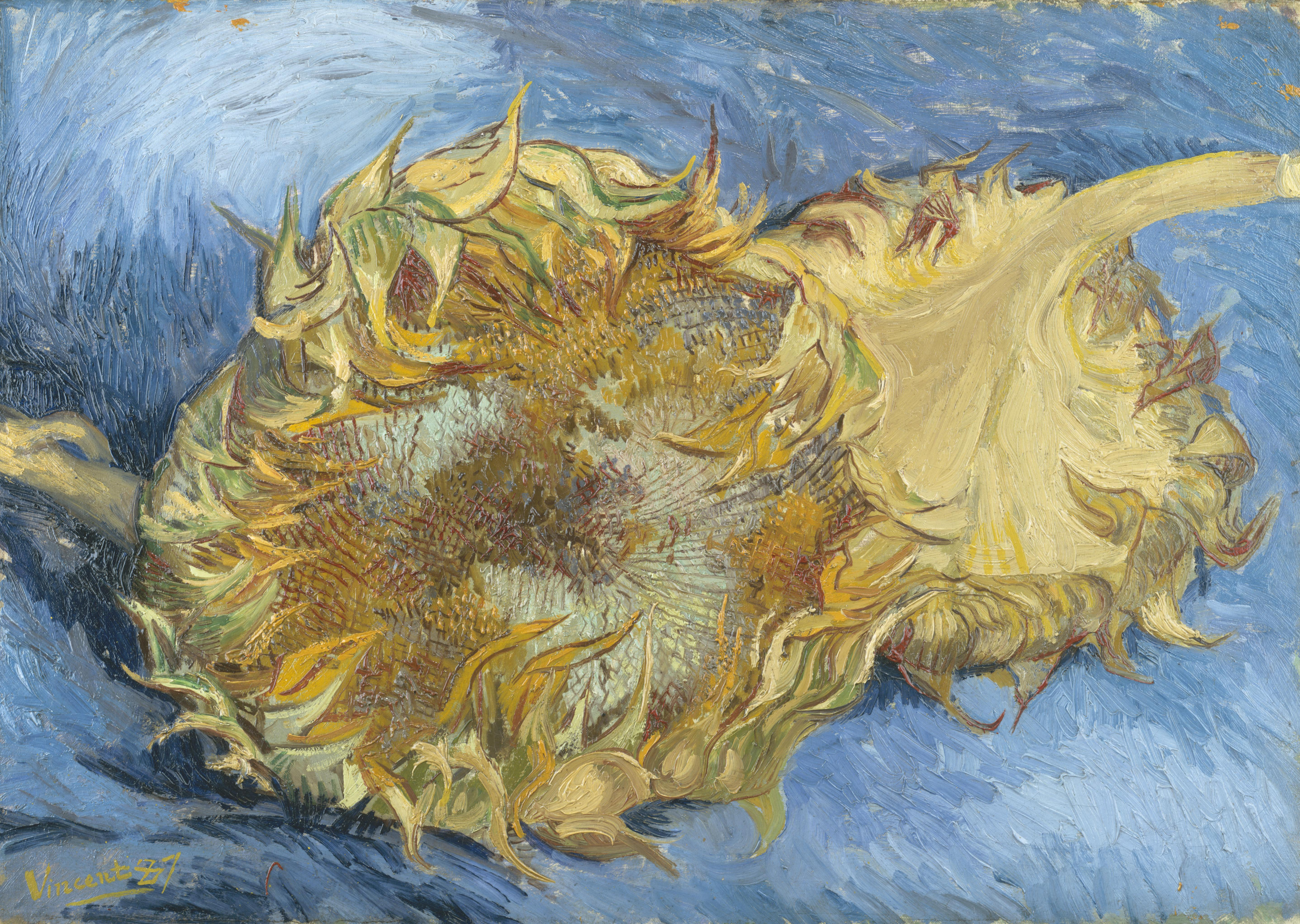
Two sunflowers
