= Maria Ida Adriana Hoogendijk =

Dutch artist (1874–1942)

Maria Ida Adriana van Blaaderen-Hoogendijk
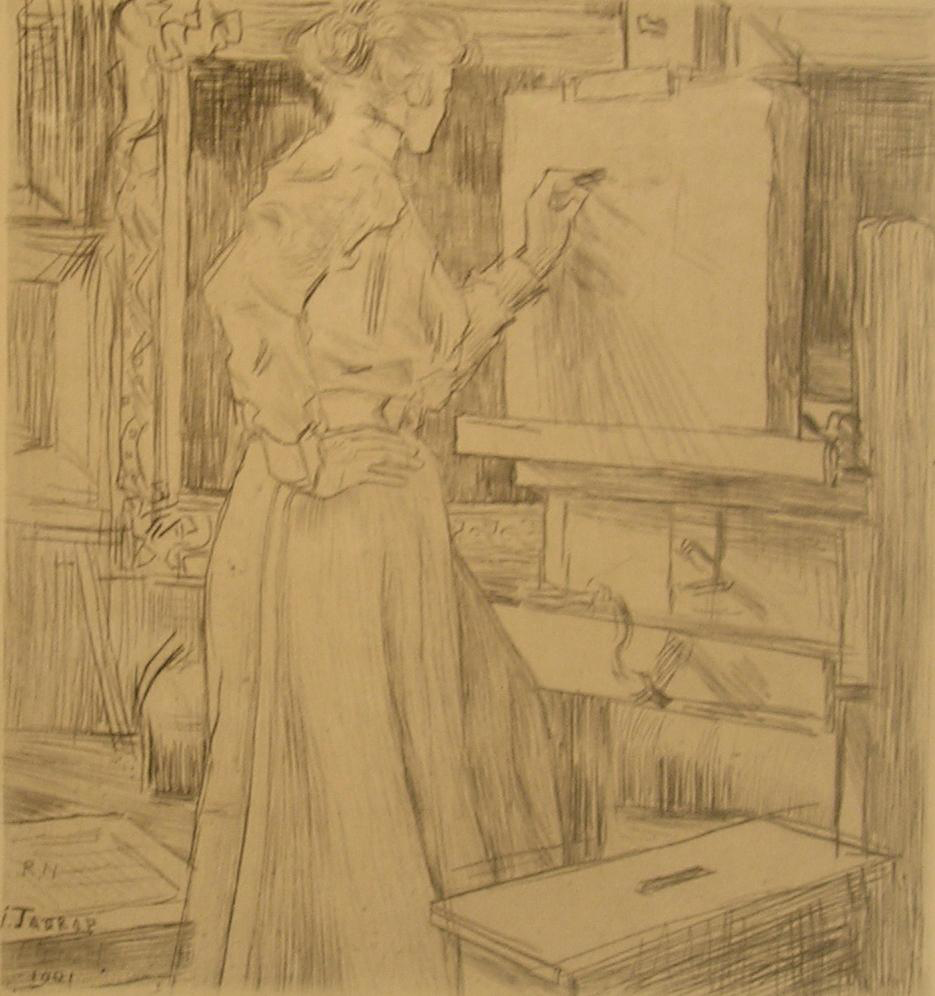
- Portrait of Riet Hoogendijk by Jan Toorop, 1901
- Born: Maria Ida Adriana Hoogendijk; 20 May 1874; Krimpen aan den IJssel, Netherlands
- Died: 13 April 1942 (aged 48); Amsterdam, Netherlands
- Other names: Riet Hoogendijk
- Known for: Painting
- Spouse: Gerrit van Blaaderen (m. 1905; died in 1935)

Maria Ida Adriana (Riet) Hoogendijk (1874-1942) was a Dutch painter and art collector, best known today for her bequest of 50 paintings to the Rijksmuseum as representative of the heirs of Cornelis Hoogendijk.

== Biography ==
Hoogendijk was born as the youngest of six children on 20 May 1874 in Krimpen aan den IJssel. Her mother died the year after she was born, and her father died when she was nine. She was sent with two sisters to live with an aunt in Gouda, South Holland. She became interested in art thanks to her older brother Cornelis and accompanied him on trips to art auctions. She followed in his footsteps and studied at the Rijksakademie van beeldende kunsten (State Academy of Fine Arts) in Amsterdam and the Akademie van beeldende kunsten (Den Haag) (Royal Academy of Art, The Hague). Her teachers included Carel Lodewijk Dake (1857-1918), Jacob Hendrik Geerlings, Frits Jansen, and Egbert Schaap. She lived in the large house on Bezuidenhoutseweg 365 in The Hague which her brother had purchased for his art collection.

In 1905 she married fellow artist Gerrit van Blaaderen. Because her older sister Wilhelmina had married and moved to Amsterdam, she couldn't leave her sister Johanna alone in the house in the Hague, because her brother Cornelis had been in a sanitorium since Fall of 1900. When he died in 1911, she decided to liquidate the family collection and in doing so, managed to cobble together a selection to donate to the Rijksmuseum that would be worthy of tax exemption from Dutch inheritance tax, a method that had been used by Julie Amelie Charlotte Castelnau successfully in London for the Wallace collection. The law was changed in 1912 and her selection was accepted by the board of governors, who already knew her brother-in-law Ferdinand Kranenburg well from the Hoogendijk loan that had been on show there since 1907.

Hoogendijk's work was included in the 1939 exhibition and sale Onze Kunst van Heden (Our Art of Today) at the Rijksmuseum in Amsterdam. She was a member of Arti et Amicitiae.

Hoogendijk died on 13 April 1942 in Amsterdam.
