= A Woman Walking in a Garden =

Painting by Vincent van Gogh

A Woman Walking in a Garden (F368)
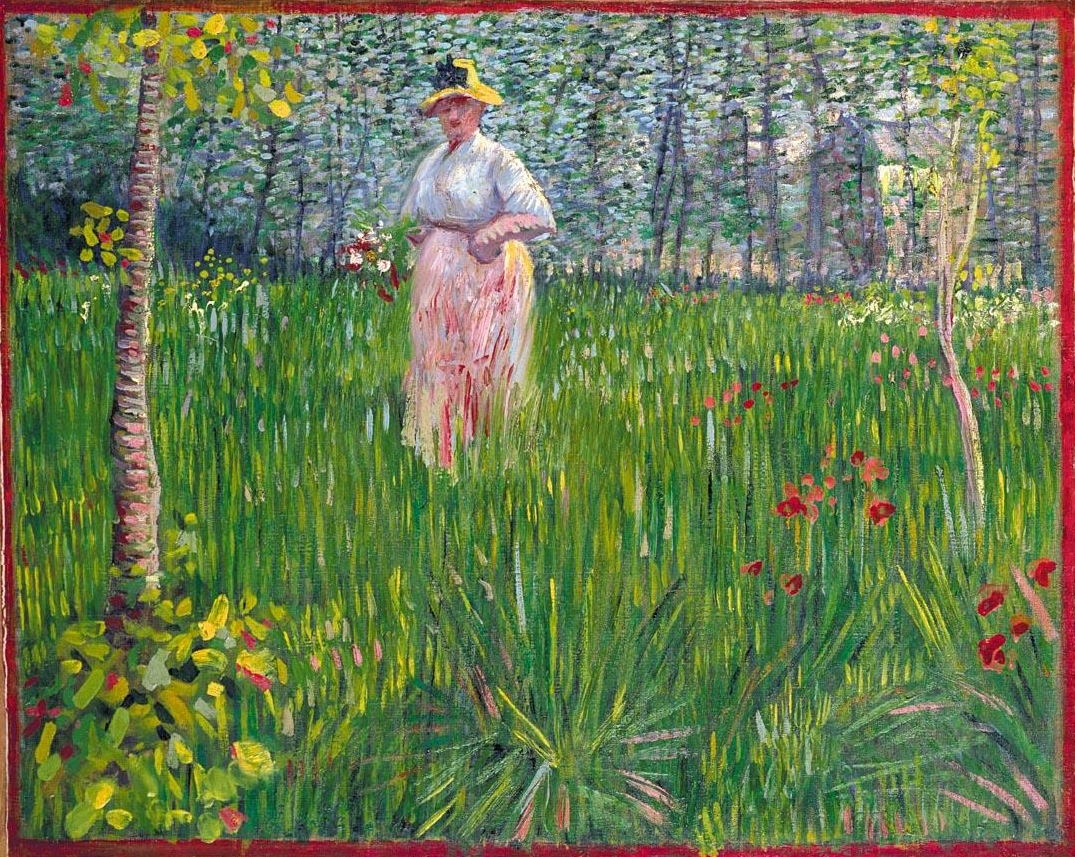
- Artist: Vincent van Gogh
- Year: 1887
- Catalogue: F368; JH1262
- Medium: Oil on canvas
- Dimensions: 48.0 cm × 60.0 cm (18.9 in × 23.6 in)
- Location: Private collection

A Woman Walking in a Garden is an oil-on-canvas painting by Dutch Post-Impressionist painter, Vincent van Gogh. This painting was created in 1887 during the two years van Gogh lived in the northern suburbs of Paris. There is a woman walking through a lush and green garden dotted with flowers and in the background there is a building concealed behind a thick row of trees. A red paint border along the edge of the canvas frames the scene.This painting is a part of the Riverbank in Clichy Triptych along with Fishing in Spring housed at the Art Institute of Chicago and River Bank in Springtime housed at the Dallas Museum of Art. All three pieces have red borders as to indicate their association to each other in a triptych.

== Context ==
=== Van Gogh in Paris ===
Van Gogh moved to Paris in 1886 following a wave of artists, such as Georges Seurat, Paul Signac, Charles Angrand and Emile Bernard, who were relocating to Paris and its northern suburbs.

Artists were drawn to the city after a newly built train system from Paris to the suburbs made the countryside and landscapes along the Seine River more accessible. Paris was also abundant in opportunities for artistic training and exhibitions with as it had a robust artistic culture and community. Van Gogh himself came to Paris hoping to develop and learn artistically and he ultimately did take lessons while in Paris.

The Seine River had long been a place of recreation and relaxation, but towards the end of the 19th century towns along the Seine, such as Clichy, the setting of A Woman Walking in a Garden, began to be industrialized and populated since of its new convenience to Paris. Coal and gas as well as manufacturing facilities were built along the river which created a contrast within the suburbs between the serene and beautiful, and the evolving. This new juxtaposed landscape served as the subject of many impressionist works during the late 19th century and particularly fascinated van Gogh who was interested by the contrast within the landscape and wanted to examine it through his art. Specifically, The Riverbank in Clichy Triptych is a calm and recreational perspective on the river.

Van Gogh directly interacted with the other impressionist painters which influenced and inspired his work. Among many other interactions, van Gogh was initially prompted to go to the northwest suburbs just days after viewing Ponton de la Félicité, a painting by Signac, in 1887. In recent research, it was found that van Gogh made this trip from Paris to Asnières and its surrounding area almost everyday for three months between May and July in 1887 in which he produced around 40 paintings, including A Woman Walking in a Garden.

In Paris van Gogh found many sources of inspiration for his art in the unique landscape and the other young avant-garde artists around him experimenting with new styles and techniques.

== Style Experimentation ==
Van Gogh's time in Paris is regarded as the beginning of his radical stylistic development from his darker colored realism works to his bright and textured impressionist style in some of his most celebrated works such as Starry Night. A Woman Walking in a Garden epitomizes the elements of his artistic experimentation and evolution from this time.

The Clichy Triptych was van Gogh's first ever experimentation with painting a triptych. He ultimately created two more triptychs while in Paris of the diverse and evolving landscapes of other Parisian suburban towns.

A Woman Walking in a Garden also has a significantly brighter color palette than van Gogh's previous realism characterized by earthy tones and little contrast. This painting reflects his drastic shift towards vibrancy in his works while in Paris. The Clichy Triptych collectively is known for its pale green coloration. Van Gogh wrote in a letter to his sister, Willemien van Gogh, in October 1887, "when I painted the landscape and Asnières this summer I saw more color in it than before." He also wrote in another letter to his sister explaining his new usage of color, "what people demand in art nowadays is something very much alive, with strong color and great intensity." Van Gogh's new usage of color in A Woman Walking in a Garden was a result of the brighter subjects he was painting, the inspiration he found in Paris and the new impressionism he was experimenting with. Van Gogh also used brighter and complementary colors to allow for greater contrasts and to highlight the elements of light that were unique and essential in landscapes paintings.

It was in Paris that van Gogh was first introduced to impressionism and pointillism as artists of these techniques were dominating the Paris' art scene at the time and he was personally encountering both them and their works. From exposure to these styles, van Gogh's brush work shifted dramatically while in Paris. He began experimenting with short, defined and blunt brush strokes on display in A Woman Walking in a Garden which contrasts the blended and flat stroke work in his previous realism paintings. The textured and broken style was a new technique for van Gogh when he was painting a Woman Walking in Garden but is now one of the most notable characteristics of many of van Gogh's famous impressionist works.

A Woman Walking in Garden is one of Van Gogh's early experimentations with the techniques of impressionism, a movement that he later regarded as at the forefront of. This painting holds a unique place in exemplifying van Gogh's art in the midst of his stylistic development and shift.

== The Woman ==
The woman in the painting is unknown. Many of van Gogh's subjects have been identified through his preserved letters but nothing in archives mentions the subject of his painting. It is believed the number of letters written by van Gogh in 1887 is fewer than other periods and does not reveal the subject of this painting since a large number of his letters were addressed to his brother Theo who his lived with while in Paris and thus had no purpose to write to.

== Exhibition History ==
A Woman Walking in Garden was sold in 2005 by Sotheby's in London to an anonymous buyer, and has been held in a private collection since.

The painting was recently borrowed for two public displays. According to Jacquelyn N. Coutré, associate curator of paintings and sculptures of Europe at the Art Institute of Chicago, after The Van Gogh Museum in Amsterdam acquired Ponton de la Félicité by Signac in 2016, which was the work that inspired van Gogh to venture to the suburbs to paint, The Van Gogh Museum was prompted to create an exhibit highlighting van Gogh and related artists' work from Paris in collaboration with The Art Institute of Chicago. The museums each displayed similar yet different exhibits but they collaborated on the researched and creation of their respective exhibitions. In the exhibitions preparatory research much was discovered about van Gogh's work and exploration from his time in Paris and Asnières.

The Art Institute of Chicago displayed A Woman Walking in a Garden in an exhibit entitled "van Gogh and the Avant-Garde: The Modern Landscape." It was open from May to September in 2023. In the exhibit, van Gogh's work was among the works of other avante-garde artists of the time such as Georges Seurat, Paul Signac, Emile Bernard and Charles Angrand. The intention of the exhibit was to unite the works of the impressionists artists who were inspired by and painted the same Parisian countrysides and to illustrate how impactful a single location or inspiration can have on the trajectory and development of an individual artist's style and the growth of an artistic movement such as impressionism. The exhibit was well received for both the curation of works and the keen ability to display van Gogh in an exciting and unexplored way.

Just after The Art Institute's exhibit closed, from October 2023 to January 2024, The Van Gogh Museum of Amsterdam displayed their exhibition including A Woman Walking in a Garden entitled "van Gogh along the Seine." The exhibit boasted an impressive display of exclusive works currently held in private collections that were loaned to the museum; 25+ works were located and borrowed from private collections, including A Woman Walking in a Garden. This exhibit's collection was groundbreaking as it reunited seven of the nine pieces from the three triptych's van Gogh created in Paris; all three pieces of the Riverbank in Clichy Triptych were displayed together for the first time.

These exhibits were the first time that van Gogh's works from the Parisian suburbs and surrounding the Seine were investigated and explored collectively and they were the first time that A Woman Walking in a Garden was displayed in exhibition. After the painting's public displays, A Woman Walking in a Garden was returned to its private owner.

== See also ==
- List of works by Vincent van Gogh
