= Still Life with Teapot =

Painting by Paul Cézanne

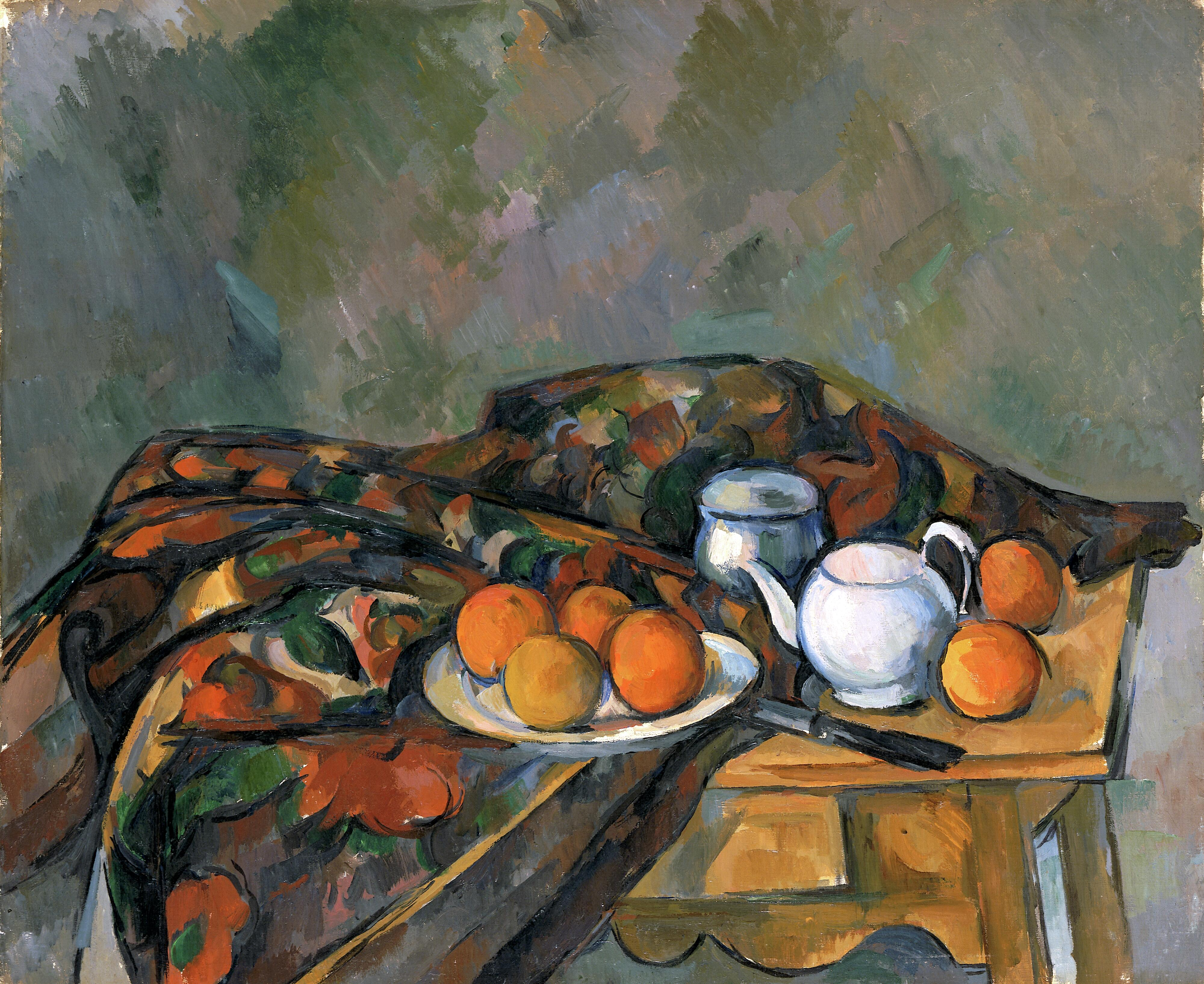
- Artist: Paul Cézanne
- Year: c. 1902–1906
- Medium: Oil on canvas
- Dimensions: 61.4 cm × 74.3 cm (24.2 in × 29.3 in)
- Location: National Museum Cardiff, Cardiff

Still Life with Teapot (French: Nature morte avec pot de thé) is a still-life oil painting dating between 1902 and 1906, by the French artist Paul Cézanne. The subject of the painting is a table draped loosely with a patterned cloth on which lie fruit, crockery and a knife. The painting was acquired by the National Museum Wales in 1952 and is on display at the National Museum Cardiff.

== Background ==
Cézanne began concentrating on painting still-life works from 1870 onwards, possibly inspired by Jean-Baptiste-Siméon Chardin's collection of still-life compositions that were acquired by the Louvre in 1869. As well as Chardin, Cézanne was influenced by the Spanish and Dutch artists of the genre.

Fruit was the central motif in much of Cézanne's still-life work, and in his earlier paintings he would often place the fruit separately from each other, as seen in his 1879 work Vessels, Fruit and Cloth. In the 1880s he changed the structure of his compositions and his approach to the subject, developing more elaborate counterpoints between shape, colour and textures.

== Description ==
Still Life with Teapot was painted towards the end of Cézanne's life, thought to be between 1902 and 1906. It was painted at his studio in Aix-en-Provence and the table on which the objects are arranged still survives at the studio. A cloth is draped over the table, arranged carefully in elaborate but carefully arranged folds. On the cloth is a sugar bowl and a plate on which four fruit have been placed. On an uncovered section of the table, to the right of the painting, rests a teapot, knife and a further two fruit. The strong colours of the vessels, fruit and cloth are set against a washed-out green-grey background. In her 2005 book Colour and Light, Ann Sumner describes the fruit as peaches, though in 1962, art critic David Sylvester stated, "...we don't really know if they are and which of them are apples, oranges, apricots and we don't care. What we know as we look at them, know it physically in our bodies, is the feeling of having the shape of a sphere, a shape that is perfectly compact...."

Cézanne would change his position when painting his later still-life works to concentrate on each object individually. This resulted in the perspective of his work to shift slightly. This can be seen in Still Life with Teapot in which the plate appears to bend and the table legs do not correspond with the angle of the table top.

== Provenance ==
By 1920, Still Life with Teapot had come into the ownership of the Paris-based art firm, Bernheim-Jeune. It was purchased in 1920 by Welsh philanthrapist Gwendoline Davies for the sum of £2,000, and is described by the National Museum Wales as one of her finest acquisitions. When Davies died in 1952 she bequested her collection of art work to the National Museum of Wales, among them Still Life with Teapot.

In 1961 the work was sent on loan to an exhibition in France. While on exhibit it was stolen, and the insurance company paid out a value of £60,000 for its loss. The museum initially placed the monies into a Cardiff Corporation Mortgage fund, but were obliged to return the costs when the painting was recovered by police and returned to Cardiff. As of 2019 it is on view at the National Museum Cardiff in gallery 16.

== See also ==
- List of paintings by Paul Cézanne

== Bibliography ==
- Sumner, Ann (2005). Colour and Light: Fifty Impressionist and Post-Impressionist Works at the National Museum of Wales. Cardiff: National Museum of Wales. ISBN 0-7200-0551-5.
