= The Murder (Cézanne) =

Painting by Paul Cézanne

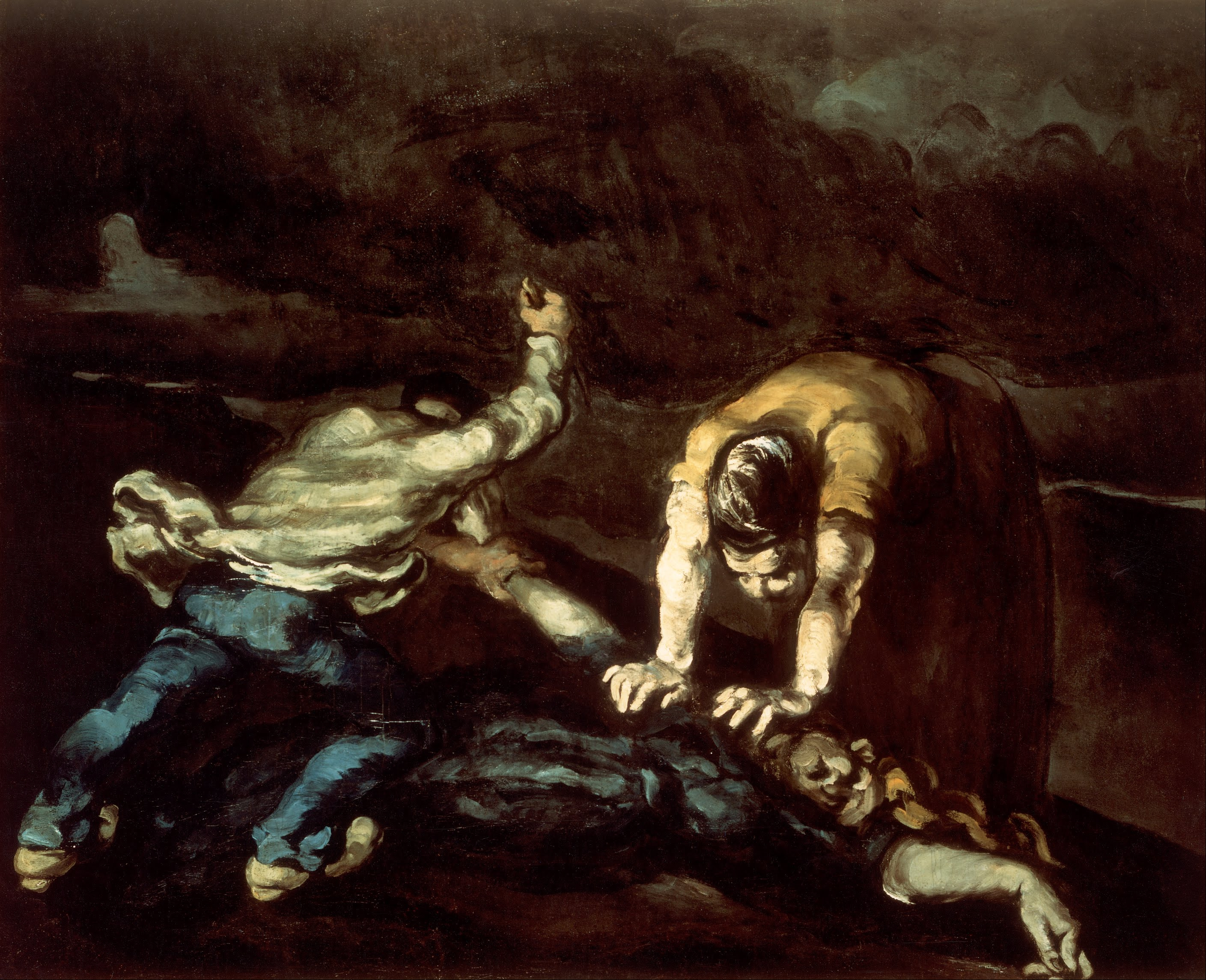
- Artist: Paul Cézanne
- Year: 1867 - 1870
- Medium: Oil on canvas
- Dimensions: 640 cm × 810 cm (250 in × 320 in)
- Location: Walker Art Gallery, Liverpool

The Murder is an oil-on-canvas painting by the French artist Paul Cézanne, created between 1867 and 1870. Measuring approximately 64 by 81 centimetres, it is held by the Walker Art Gallery in Liverpool. The museum acquired the painting in 1964 with financial assistance from the Art Fund.

== Description ==
The painting depicts two figures attacking a woman beside a turbulent body of water. One assailant restrains the victim while the other appears to prepare the fatal blow. The figures are arranged in a compressed and unstable composition that emphasises physical force and the violence of the scene.

Cézanne applied the paint in broad, forceful strokes, including areas worked with a palette knife. The dark colours, dramatic lighting and agitated surface give the painting a nightmarish atmosphere. These features have sometimes been compared with the violent and psychologically unsettling imagery of the Spanish artist Francisco Goya.

== Background and interpretation ==
The Murder belongs to Cézanne’s early period, when he frequently painted dramatic, erotic or violent subjects. These works differ significantly from the landscapes and still lifes for which he later became best known. The painting has been associated with Cézanne’s youthful interest in Romantic literature and with the violent themes found in novels by his childhood friend Émile Zola.

The exact literary source of the scene has not been established. Rather than illustrating a documented event, the painting is generally interpreted as an imagined act of violence intended to convey emotional and physical intensity. Its turbulent brushwork and sombre colouring reinforce the brutality of the subject.

== See also ==
- List of paintings by Paul Cézanne
