= Bridge Across a Pond =

Painting by Paul Cézanne

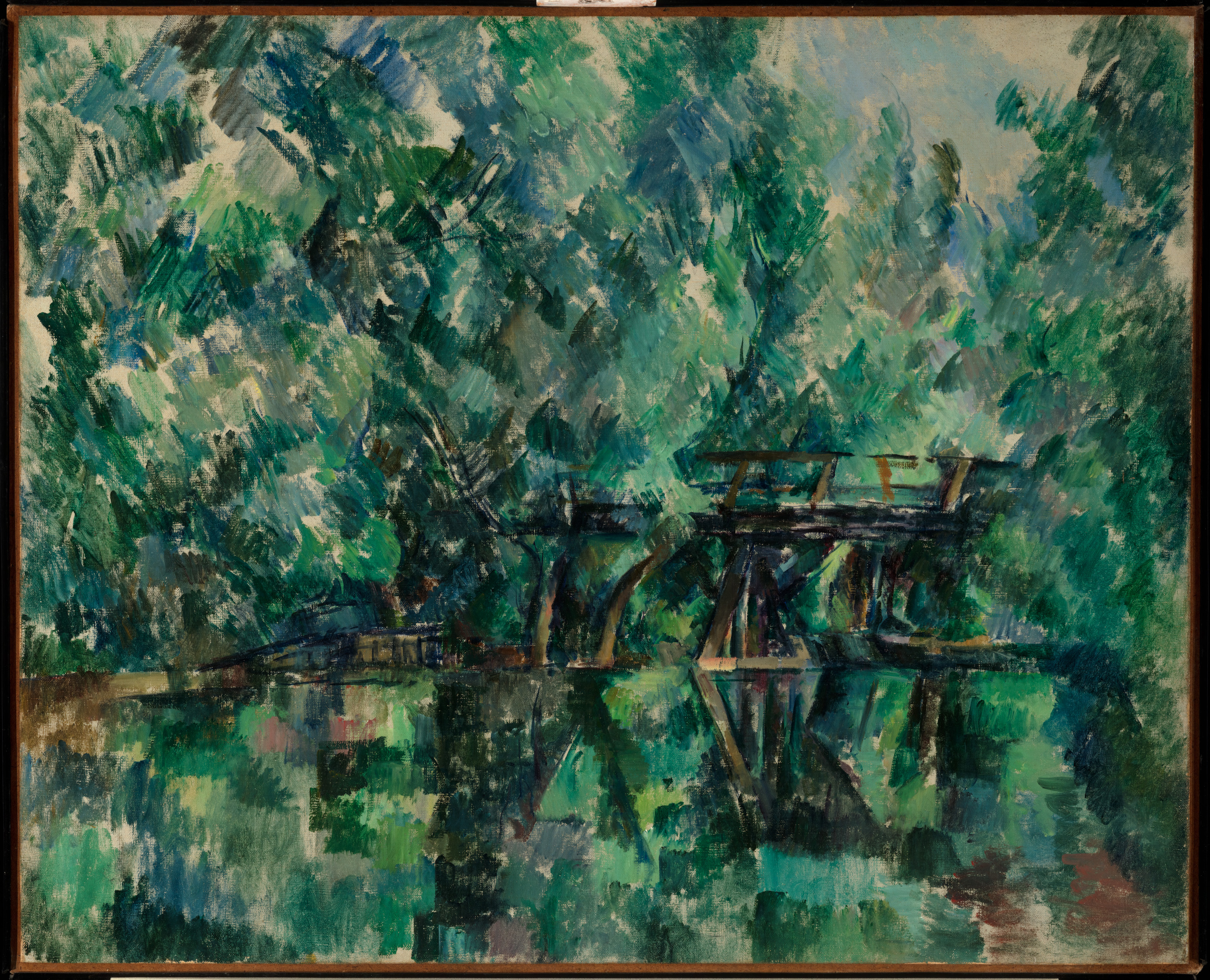
- Artist: Paul Cézanne
- Year: 1895-98
- Medium: oil on canvas
- Dimensions: 64 cm × 79 cm (25 in × 31 in)
- Location: Pushkin Museum, Moscow

Bridge Across a Pond is an oil on canvas painting by Paul Cézanne, from 1895-1898. It is held in the Pushkin Museum, in Moscow, since 1948.

== Description ==
In this painting, Cézanne captured an untouched, densely wooded corner of Aix-en-Provence. At the time, the artist was already elderly, lonely, and ill, but his pursuit of artistic exploration was unwavering. It was during this period that he started using watercolor, and his oil paintings became more translucent. Even in this landscape, where the sky is almost invisible and the water loses its transparency due to the reflection of the forest, matter seems to acquire density before the viewer.

Almost the entire painting is filled with emerald tones. Only the bridge and a strip of the shore allow the eye to reach the horizon and maintain balance. Above this simple wooden bridge, an event of cosmic proportions, mystical, fantastic, and sacred, is taking place.

In his painting, Cézanne juxtaposes the real landscape with its reflection in a lake. The reflection in the water is painted with a denser, more intense color, while the clearings between the trees on the shore leave areas of the canvas unpainted.

Cézanne doesn't include people on his landscapes; this land is uninhabited. The multidirectional diagonal brushstrokes create a sense of movement within the painting that an observer would probably not be able to bear if they were nearby.

== See also ==
- List of paintings by Paul Cézanne
