= Saint-Pierre Cemetery (Aix-en-Provence) =

Cemetery in France

Coordinates: 43.5238°N 5.4595°E

- Interactive map of Saint-Pierre Cemetery

Details
- Established: 1824
- Location: Aix-en-Provence
- Country: France
- Type: Public, non-denominational

The Saint-Pierre Cemetery (French: "Cimetière Saint-Pierre") is a cemetery in Aix-en-Provence. It is home to the burials of many renowned painters and sculptors.

== Location ==
It is located on the Avenue Des Déportés de la Résistance Aixoise in Aix-en-Provence. It is opposite the Stade Georges Carcassonne, a sports stadium.

== History ==
It was established in 1824. It was built upon two former private, adjacacent cemeteries: a Jewish one and a Protestant one. It spans seven hectares.

== Notable burials ==
- Jean Amado (1922–1995), sculptor.
- Henri Brémond (1865–1933), Jesuit author
- Paul Cézanne (1839–1906), painter.
- Jean-Antoine Constantin (1744–1844), painter
- Achille Empéraire (1829–1898), painter
- Hippolyte Ferrat (1822–1882), sculptor
- Louis Nicolas Philippe Auguste de Forbin (1779–1841), painter
- Konstanty Gaszyński (1809-1866) - Polish romantic poet, insurgent
- Jean-Baptiste Gaut (1819–1891), author
- Louis Gautier (1855–1947), painter
- René Génin (1890–1967), actor
- Louise Germain (1874–1939), painter
- Victor Leydet (1845–1908), politician
- François Mignet (1796–1884), historian
- Darius Milhaud (1892–1974), composer.
- Sextius Alexandre François de Miollis (1759–1828), military general
- Agricol Moureau (1766–1842), Sans-culotte
- Jean Murat (1888–1968), comedian
- Barthélémy Niollon (1849–1927), painter
- Joseph Ravaisou (1865–1925), painter
- John Rewald (1912–1994).
- Henri Émilien Rousseau (1875–1933), painter
- Philippe Solari (1840–1906), sculptor
- François Vidal (1832–1911), Félibrige activist, poet
- Joseph Villevieille (1829–1916), painter
- François Zola (1796–1847), dam-builder and father of Émile Zola.
