= The Negro Scipion =

Painting by Paul Cézanne

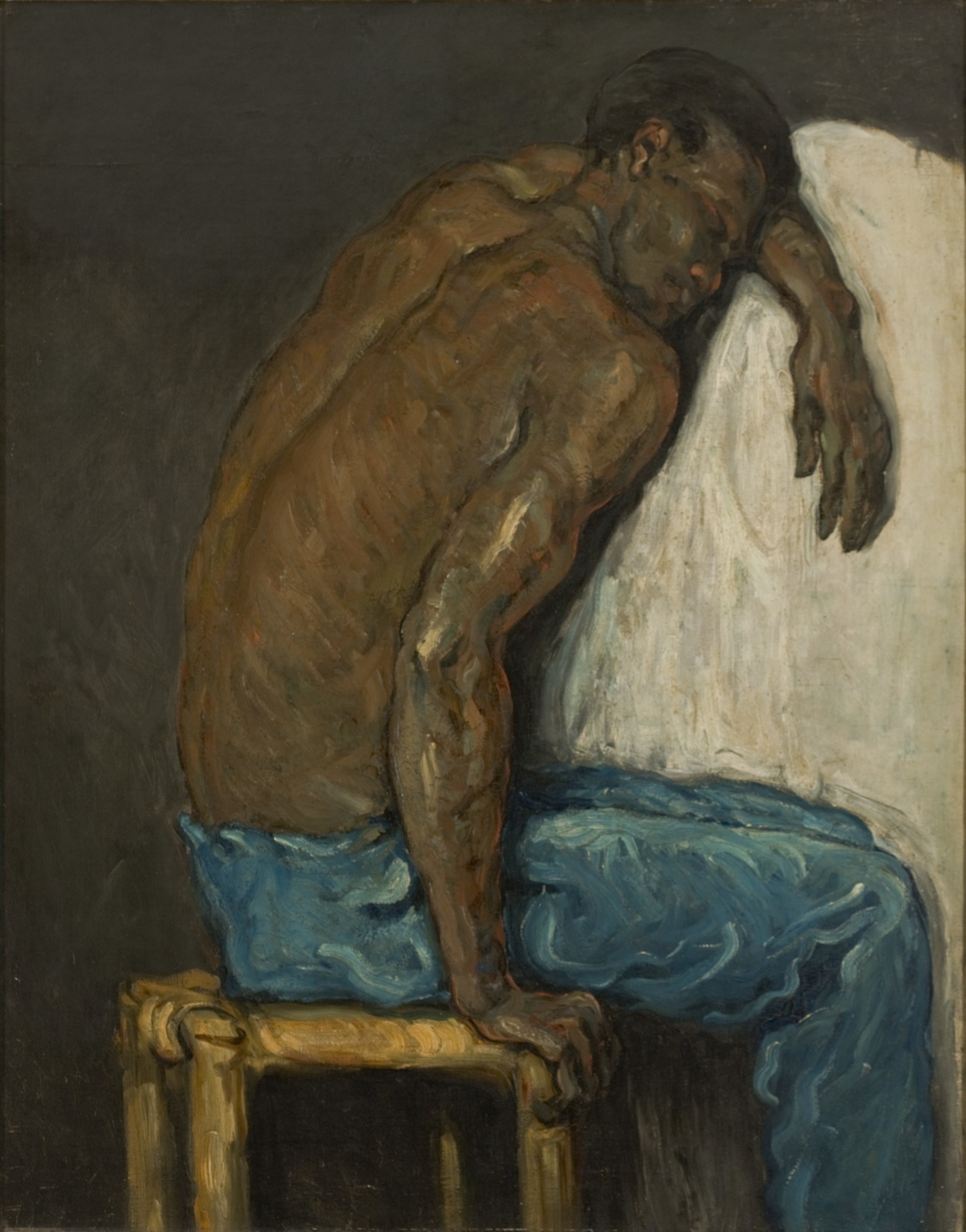
- Artist: Paul Cézanne
- Year: 1867
- Medium: Oil on canvas
- Dimensions: 107 cm × 83 cm (42 in × 33 in)
- Location: São Paulo Museum of Art, São Paulo

The Negro Scipion is an early painting by the French Post-Impressionist artist Paul Cézanne. The painting depicts a model, Scipion, in Cézanne's studio. Scipion is portrayed with an elongated torso with a muscular back, accentuated by broad brushstrokes. Cézanne used a variety of colors to modulate the tone of Scipion's back. Art historians consider the painting to be among the strongest works of Cézanne's early career, as it surprised many visitors to Monet's studio in Giverny, including Louis Vauxcelles, who described it as a "striking masterpiece" and deemed it "worthy of Delacroix".

== Context and analysis ==
Scipion was a model at the Académie Suisse, where Cézanne studied after arriving in Paris in 1862. Little else is known about him, but scholars speculate that he also posed for a plaster by Philippe Solari, which is exhibited at the Salon of 1868 titled Nègre endormi (Sleeping Negro).

Scholars have offered various interpretations of the painting, often suggesting that Scipion is mourning over the death of an unknown person. Scholars also speculate that Cézanne may have initially included another figure in the painting in the area of the white mass, which he later painted over.

The painting belonged to Monet, who owned thirteen other works by Cézanne. He kept this painting in his bedroom along with other favorite works. He considered it to be "un morceau de première force" ("a work of the greatest strength"). Originally, Monet acquired this canvas from Ambroise Vollard and subsequently passed to his son, Michel Monet, who sold it to the dealer Paul Rosenberg. The Museu de Arte in São Paulo purchased it from the Wildenstein Galleries in 1950.

== Comparison ==
The Negro Scipion, with its thick brush strokes, is often linked with Cézanne's painting The Abduction, dated 1867. Due to its similarity in style, both in the type of model and in the style of long brush strokes and unique form, scholars assign the two paintings to the same date. The Abduction is one of Cézanne's few pictures that bear a date, allowing scholars to more firmly secure the date of The Negro Scipion. Scholars regard the painting as one of three important works that Cézanne executed in either Paris or Aix in that year (The Negro Scipion, The Abduction, and Mary Magdalen).

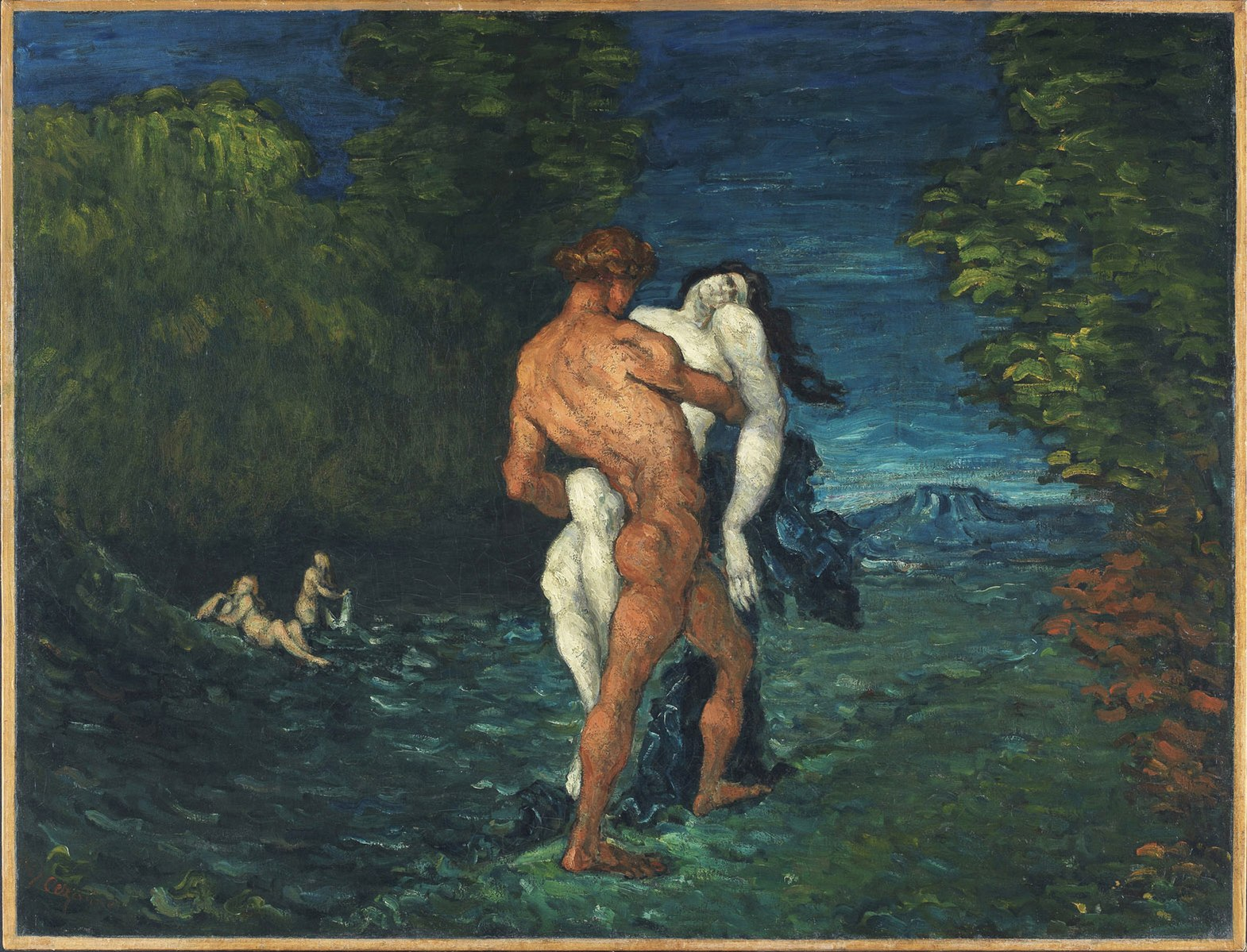
The Abduction, 1867 by Paul Cézanne

== See also ==
- List of paintings by Paul Cézanne
