= Ymbert =

Ymbert is a surname. Notable people with the surname include:

- Jean-Gilbert Ymbert (1786–1846), French playwright
- Théodore Ymbert (1827–1894), French lawyer and composer
