= The Old Man and Death =

Aesop's fable

The Old Man and Death is one of Aesop's Fables and is numbered 60 in the Perry Index. Because this was one of the comparatively rare fables featuring humans, it was the subject of many paintings, especially in France, where Jean de la Fontaine's adaptation had made it popular.

== Love of life ==
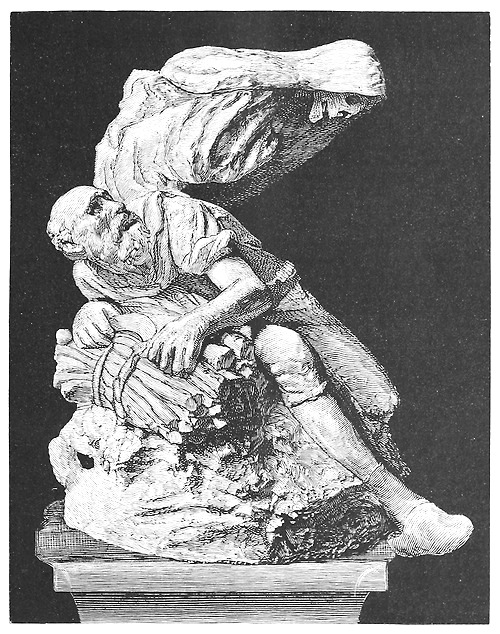
Alphonse Legros' etching of his sculptural treatment of the fable, 1882

The fable is a simple anecdote demonstrating the theme of love of life (φιλοζωία) in no matter what distressing circumstances. The standard version as it now exists is that of Roger L'Estrange's retelling: 'An old man that had travelled a great way under a huge Burden of Sticks found himself so weary that he cast it down, and called upon Death to deliver him from a more miserable Life. Death came presently at his call, and asked him his business. Pray, good Sir, says he, Do me but the Favour to help me up with my burden again.'

Because ancient sources were confined to the Greek language, the fable did not have much currency until the Renaissance. Then it was told in the fable collections of the Neo-Latin poets Gabriele Faerno (1545) and Hieronymus Osius. A French version also appeared at this time in Bernard Salomon's Les Fables d'Esope Phrygien, mises en Ryme Francoise (Lyons 1544). In England there was a Latin version in Francis Barlow's 1687 collection, accompanied by an English verse synopsis by Aphra Behn.

The story's appearance in La Fontaine's Fables contributed to the fable's growing popularity in Europe. In fact, La Fontaine wrote two and placed them side by side. La Mort et le malheureux (Death and man in misfortune, I.15) is a rewriting of the story in which the main emphasis is placed on the moral to be drawn from the situation. La Mort et le bûcheron (Death and the woodman, I.16) stays closer to the original and is prefaced by a note in which La Fontaine confesses that he was blamed for the freedom of his first version by a contemporary critic and wrote the second by way of comparison.

== Artistic interpretations ==
There have been a number of musical adaptations of La Fontaine's La Mort et le bûcheron, of which the earliest was the two-act musical (folie-vaudeville) by Henri Dupin (1791–1887) and Eugène Scribe in 1815. It was later made a lighthearted section of Francis Poulenc's ballet Les Animaux modèles (1941). There were also settings by Théodore Ymbert and Louis Lacombe (Op. 72, 1875). Later interpretations include Vladimir Cosma's as the fourth piece in Eh bien ! Dansez maintenant (2006), in the style of a saraband; and the setting of the Greek text of Aesop's fable for octet and voice by Lefteris Kordis as part of his Aesop Project (2010).

Book illustrations and prints of the fable have largely shown a skeleton, sometimes cloaked, bending over the prone woodman. A notable exception was Gustave Doré's, depicting the laden woodman leaning against a rock, in which the spectral figure of Death with his scythe is merely an outline down a forest aisle. In the 18th century, the English artist Joseph Wright of Derby painted two Gothic versions. The earliest, dating from 1774, is now in the Wadsworth Athenaeum. It depicts the woodman shrinking back from a standing skeleton in a landscape that includes an ancient ruin in the background. The other is in the Walker Art Gallery and centres on the confrontation of the two figures with only the base of the ruin behind them.

Among the French Romantic artists who used La Fontaine's fable as the inspiration for dramatic landscapes, Louis Boulanger exhibited his painting in 1833, Gabriel Bouret and Eugène-Ferdinand Buttura theirs in 1837. The latter two portray tiny figures dwarfed by the forest that surrounds them. At that time, too, Baron Félix-Sébastien Feuillet de Conches commissioned a Chinese painting of this fable and others for a special edition illustrated by artists from around the world that was published about 1840.

With the coming of Realism, artists turned to depicting the fable in terms of contemporary conditions. Among them was Jean-François Millet, whose treatment of the subject, now in the Ny Carlsberg Glyptotek, was refused by the Salon in 1859. Léon Lhermitte also painted a realistic version in 1893, while the treatment by Joseph Paul Louis Bergès (1878–1956) in 1905 is more in the Symbolist style. Another Realist, Alphonse Legros, made woodcuts and etchings of the fable, but his most celebrated etching was of the dramatic plaster sculpture he made in 1882. In this the woodman is sprawled across a rock and looks up fearfully at the cowled figure of death curving above him. A later sculpture by André Augustin Sallé, dating from 1924, depicts the exhausted peasant seated on his sticks and leaning back on his pack for support.
