= Scholastique Pitton =

French writer and historian

Jean Scholastique Pitton
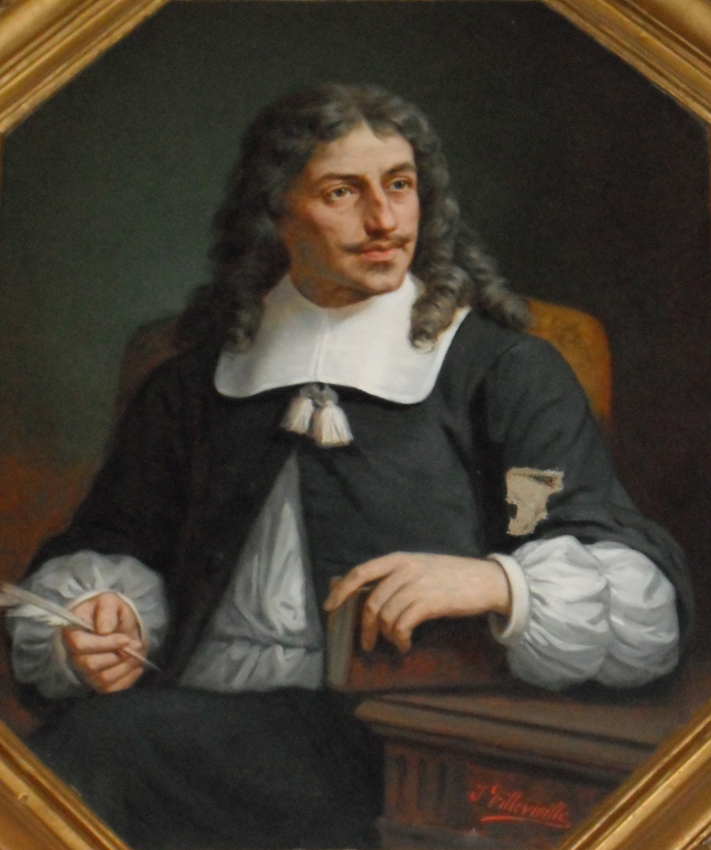
- Scholastique Pitton by Joseph Villevieille (1829–1916)
- Born: 18 December 1621; Aix-en-Provence, France
- Died: 21 February 1698 (aged 76); Aix-en-Provence, France
- Occupations: Writer, historian

Jean Scholastique Pitton (18 December 1621 – 21 February 1689) was a French writer and historian.

== Biography ==
Jean Scholastique Pitton was born in Aix-en-Provence on 18 December 1621. At a young age he decided to become a doctor, and he pursued this occupation in Saint-Chamas, Bouches-du-Rhône. However his passion for history made him neglect his patients. Pitton wanted to become a historian, following in this the model of the Aix historian Honoré Bouche whose reputation he envied. Although he admired Bouche, he never ceased "to decry him or to bite him."

After the death of his second wife, Pitton requested a dispensation from Rome to take holy orders. He obtained it the day he married his third wife. He was the author of a History of the city of Aix (1666), considered of some usefulness by his successors, although badly ordered and badly written. His later writings received better reviews. He died in Aix-en-Provence on 21 February 1698.

== Bibliography ==
Works by Pitton include,

- Histoire de la ville d'Aix, Aix (1666)
- Annales de l'église d'Aix, Lyon (1668)
- Traité des eaux chaudes d'Aix, Aix (1678)
- De conscribenda historia rerum naturalium Provinciæ, Aix (1679)
- Sentimens sur les historiens de Provence, Aix (1682)

== Sources ==
- Achard, Claude-François (1785), Dictionnaire historique de la Provence (in French)
- Hoefer, Jean Chrétien Ferdinand, ed. (1862), Nouvelle bibliographie générale depuis les temps les plus reculés jusqu'à nos jours (in French), vol. XXXIX, Ed. Firmin-Didot
