= Louis Gabriel Montigny =

French playwright and writer

- Born: 3 December 1784; Paris, France
- Died: 10 January 1846 (aged 61); Paris, France
- Occupations: Playwright, writer

Louis Gabriel Montigny (3 December 1784 – 10 January 1846) was a 19th-century French playwright and writer.

== Short biography ==
Louis Gabriel was the son of Rémy Montigny, master perfumer and of Marie-Madeleine-Gabrielle Mignot, domiciled rue Saint-Honoré. He married Julie-Celestine Massiet 18 July 1825 in Montron, (Aisne).

An officer in the military, director of the Moniteur de l'armée, he became a journalist and a dramatist. His plays were presented on the most important parisians stages of the 19th century, including the Théâtre de la Porte-Saint-Martin, the Théâtre de l'Ambigu-Comique, and the Théâtre de la Gaîté.

He is buried at Montmartre Cemetery, 22nd division, with his wife who died 15 January 1879 in the 16th arrondissement of Paris, his daughter Marie-Louise-Delphine de Montigny (1826-1897), and his son in law, general Joseph-Augustin-Eugène Daguerre (1814-1879). The grave is to the right of the tomb of the painter Gustave Moreau, facing l'avenue du Tunnel.

== Works ==
- 1821: Les Français en cantonnement, ou la Barbe postiche, vaudeville in 1 act
- 1822: Mon cousin Lalure, comedy in 1 act, en prose
- 1823: Fragments d'un miroir brisé, anecdotes contemporaines (françaises et anglaises), traits de morale et d'observation, esquisses de mœurs, revue des usages, aperçus philosophiques, réflexions, remarques, bons mots et réparties
- 1824: Dix aventures de garnison : le Chirurgien improvisé, le Moderne Joseph, Histoire d'une jolie comtesse, la Fille du pasteur de Neustadt, la Morale à la hussarde, Athénaïs, la Belle inconnue, la Soubrette, Une aventure tragique, les Trois duels
- 1824: Le Troubadour étique, romance
- 1825: Le Provincial à Paris, esquisses des mœurs parisiennes, 3 vols.
- 1825 Le Carnaval, ou les Figures de cire, folie-parade-vaudeville en 1 act
- 1825: La Chaise de poste, melodrama in 2 acts, with Saint-Amand
- 1825: Les Girouettes de village, comedy in 1 act, mingled with couplets, with Saint-Amand
- 1825: La Dot et la Fille, ou le Commis marchand, comedy in 1 act, mingled with couplets, with W. Lafontaine
- 1826: Le Commis-voyageur, ou le Bal et la Saisie, comédie-vaudeville en 1 act
- 1826: Mon ami de Paris, ou le Retour en province, comedy in 1 act, mingled with couplets
- 1827: Le Café de la garnison, vaudeville in 1 act, mingled with couplets
- 1827: Les Cavaliers et les Fantassins, tableau militaire in 1 act
- 1827: Le Colonel Duvar, fils naturel de Napoléon, publié d'après les Mémoires d'un contemporain
- 1827: Le Mari de toutes les femmes, comédie-vaudeville in 1 act
- 1828: La Nourrice sur lieu, scènes de famille, mingled with couplets, with Armand-François Jouslin de La Salle, Théodore Nézel and Jean-Gilbert Ymbert
- 1833: Souvenirs anecdotiques d'un officier de la Grande Armée
- Quinze jours à Prague

== Bibliography ==
- Ludovic Lalanne, Dictionnaire historique de la France, 1872, p. 1309
- Camille Dreyfus, André Berthelot, La Grande encyclopédie, 1886, p. 254
