= Hippolyte Ferrat =

French sculptor

- Born: Jean Joseph Hippolyte Romain Ferrat; August 9, 1822; Aix-en-Provence, Bouches-du-Rhône, Provence-Alpes-Côte d'Azur, France
- Died: October 24, 1882 (aged 60); Aix-en-Provence, Bouches-du-Rhône, Provence-Alpes-Côte d'Azur, France
- Resting place: Saint-Pierre Cemetery
- Occupation: Sculptor

Hippolyte Ferrat (1822–1882) was a French sculptor from Aix-en-Provence. He specialised in busts. He designed public sculptures in Provence as well as busts for private collections and city halls. His work can be found in museums in Europe and the United States.

== Early life ==
Hippolyte Ferrat was born on August 9, 1822, in Aix-en-Provence, France.

He was educated at the École nationale supérieure des Beaux-Arts in Paris, where James Pradier was one of his professors.

== Career ==
Ferrat designed public sculptures in his hometown of Aix-en-Provence and in nearby Marseille. He designed one of the sculptures at the top of the Fontaine de la Rotonde in 1860. He also designed a bust of François Granet, a painter from Aix, at the top of the Fontaine Bellegarde. Meanwhile, he designed caryatids and the pediment on the Hôtel Louvre et Paix in Marseille.

Ferrat designed many busts for private collections and city halls. His sculpture entitled 'Le Prince impérial' is exhibited at the Château de Compiègne. In 1849, he designed The Fall of Icarus, which is now exhibited at the Philadelphia Museum of Art. Moreover, he designed a bust of Hippolyte Fortoul, a politician, in 1857. It was given to the city of Digne in 1868, and it is still in their collection to this day. In 1858, he designed a statue of François Denis Tronchet, another politician. It was given to the city of Lisieux in 1935, and it is still in their collection.

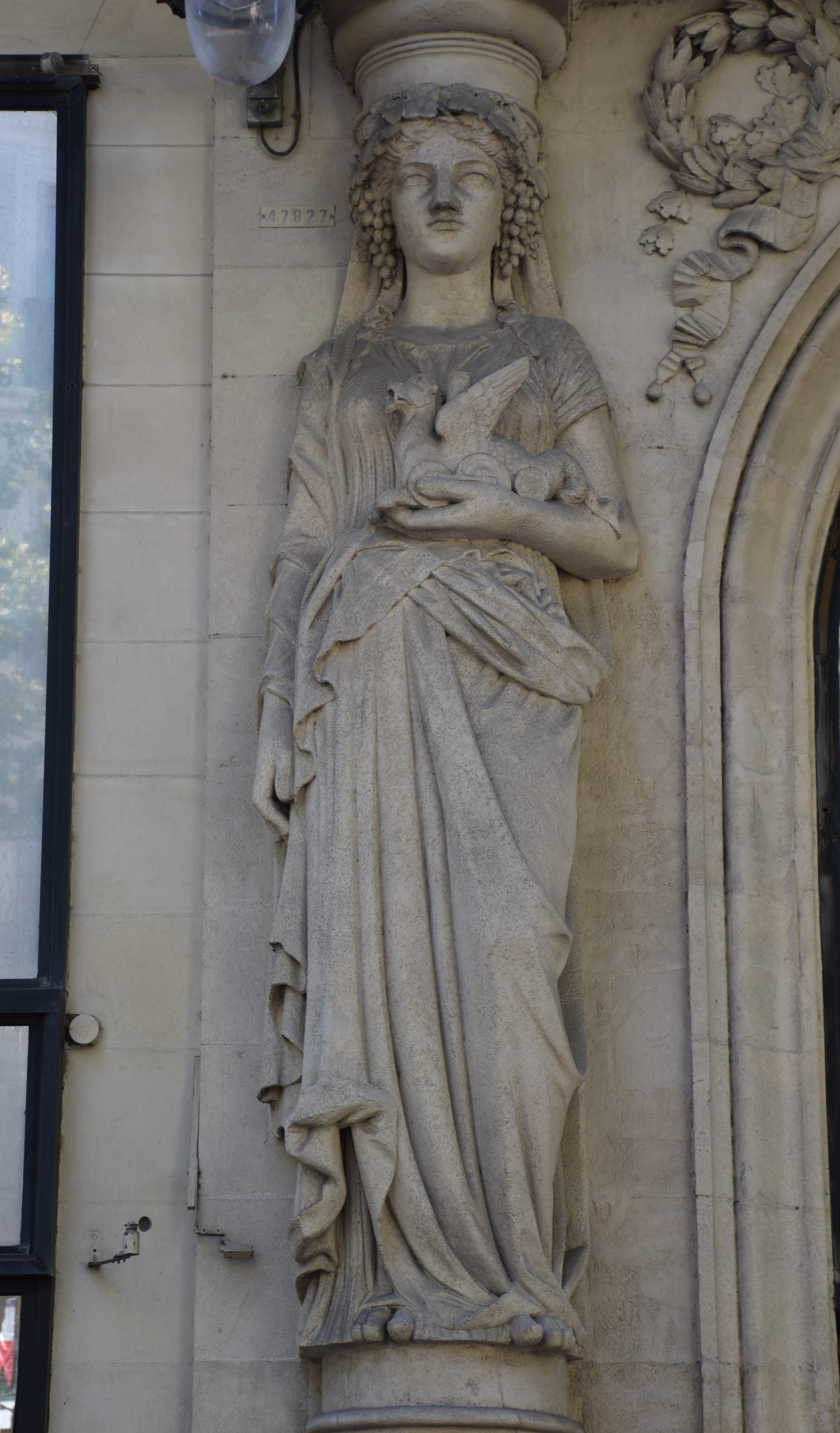
Allegorical figure of America (1863), Hôtel Louvre et Paix, Marseille

== Death ==
He died on October 24, 1882, in Aix-en-Provence. He was buried at the Saint-Pierre Cemetery in Aix.

== Legacy ==
The Salle Hippolyte Ferrat in Le Tholonet near Aix-en-Provence is named in his honour.

== Gallery ==
Sculptures designed by Hippolyte Ferrat
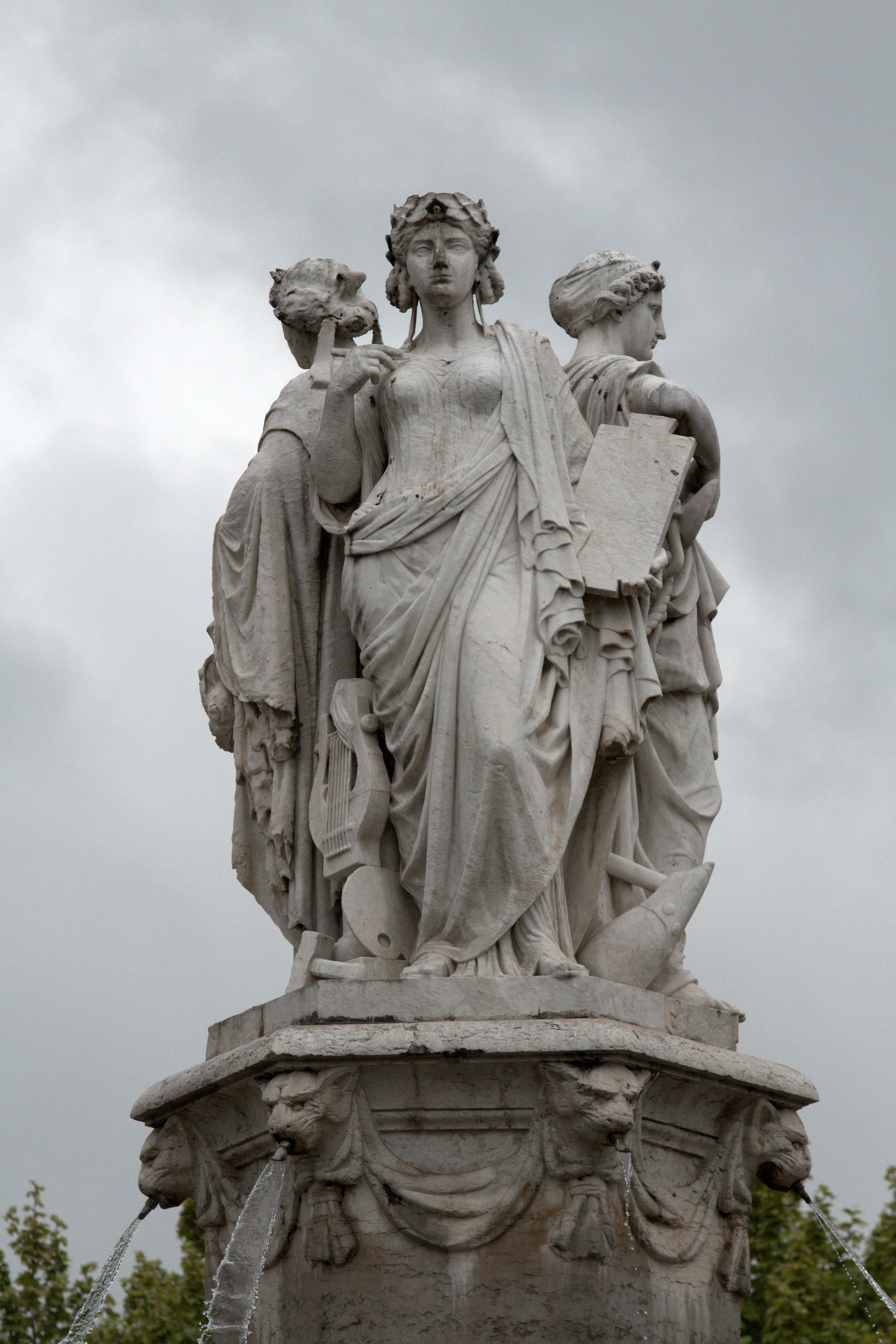
Sculpture at the top of the Fontaine de la Rotonde in Aix-en-Provence

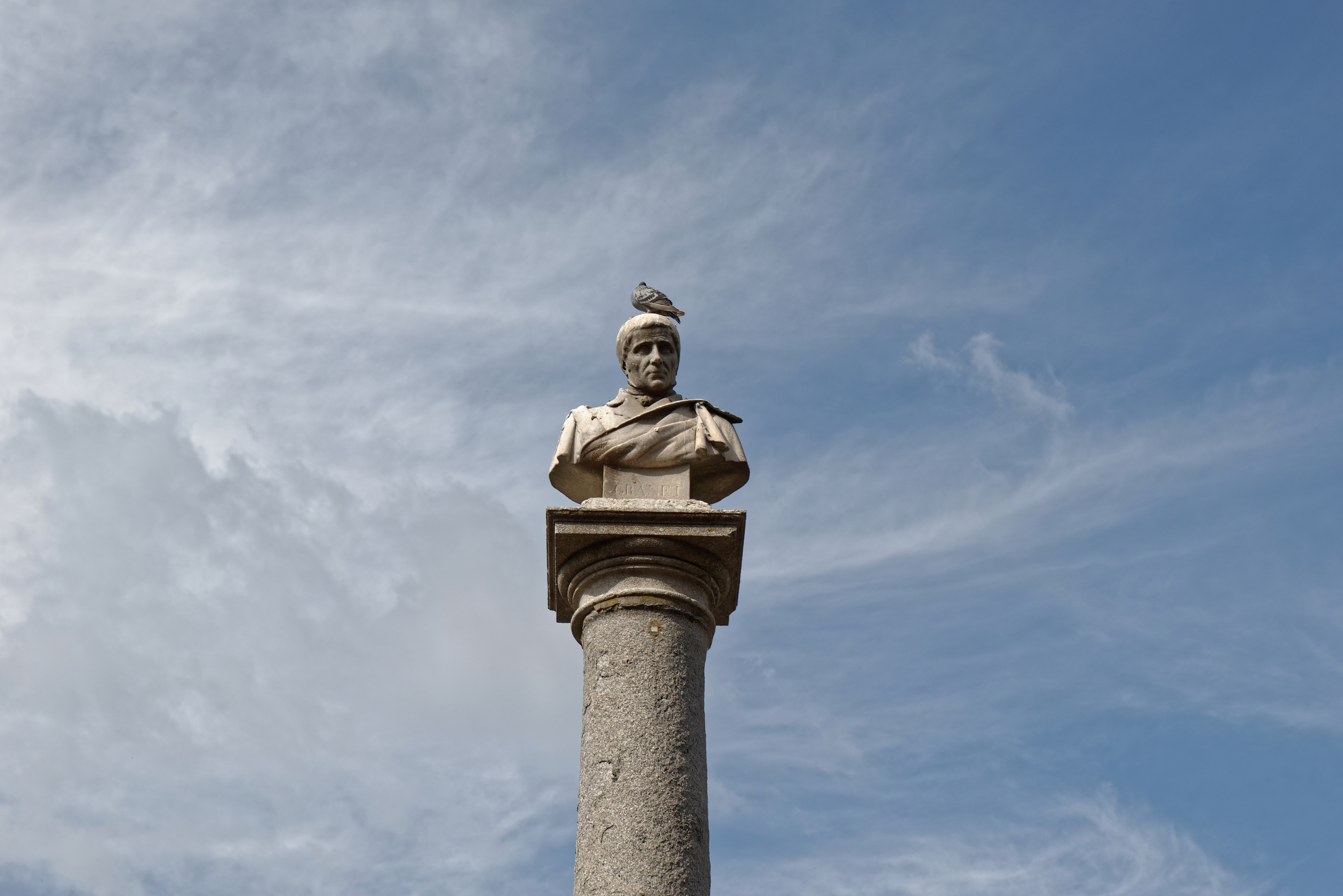
Sculpture at the top of the Fontaine Bellegarde in Aix-en-Provence

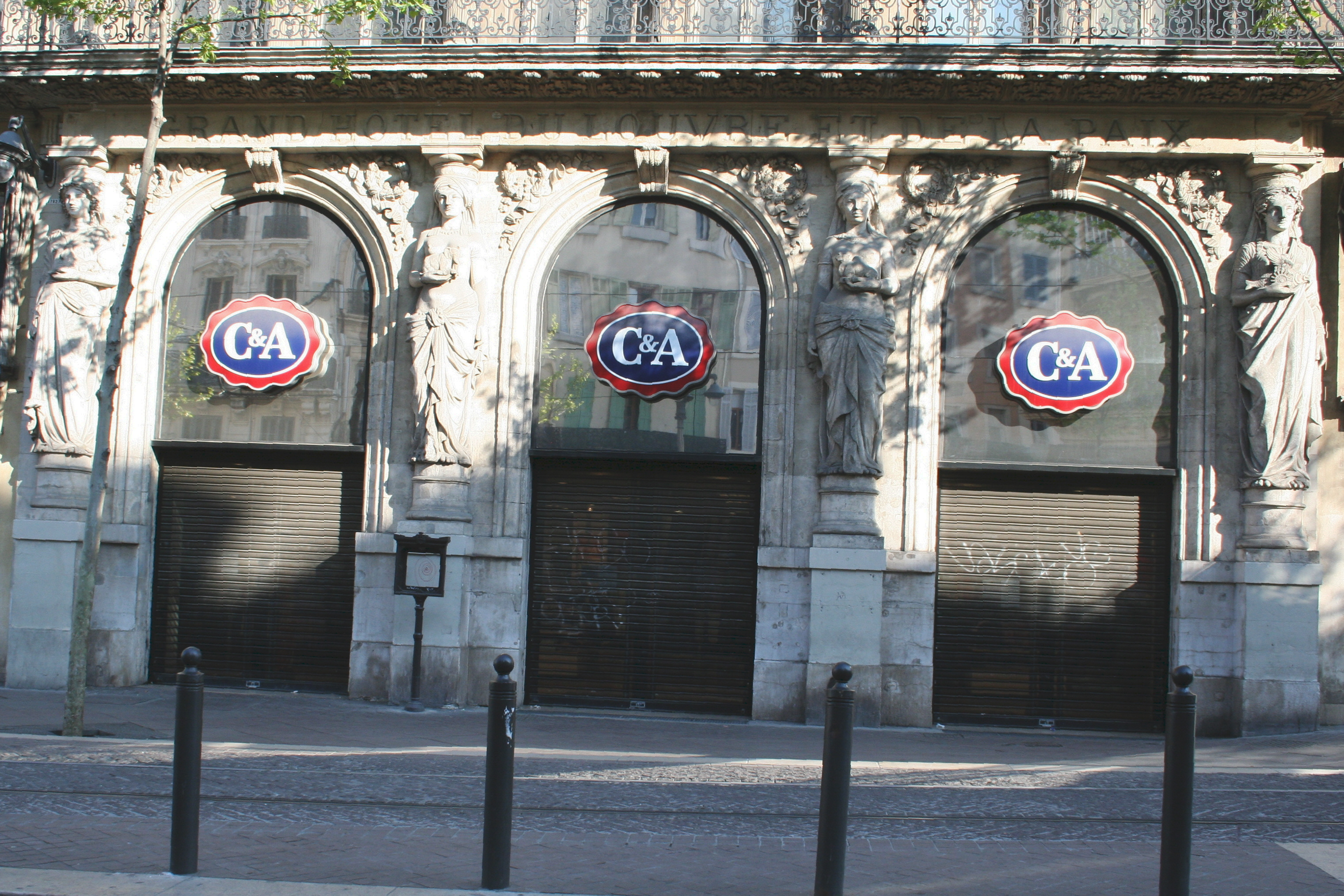
Caryatids on the Hôtel Louvre et Paix in Marseille

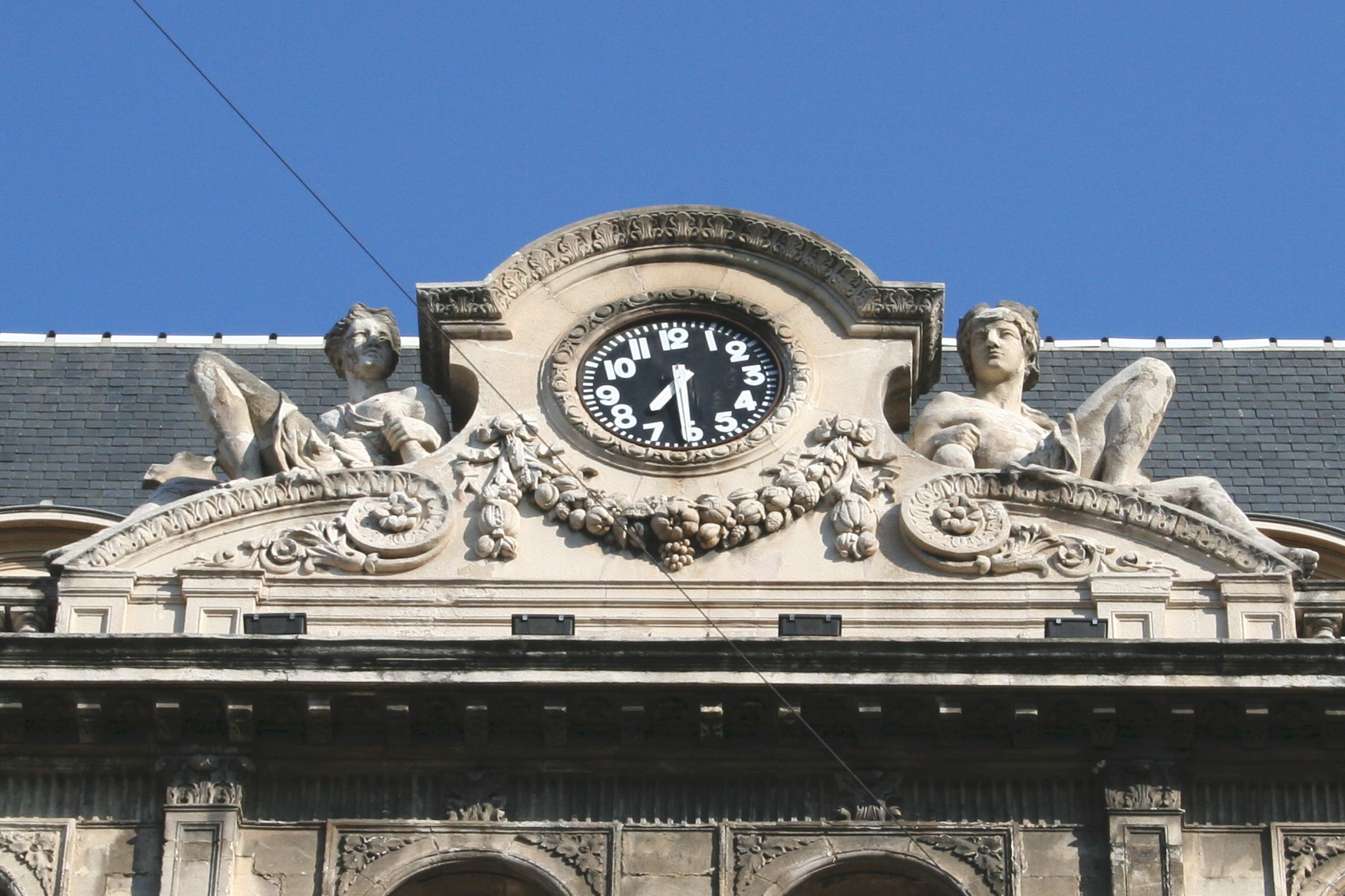
Pediment on the Hôtel Louvre et Paix in Marseille
