= Académie Suisse =

Former art school in Paris, France

Coordinates: 48.8545°N 2.3446°E

The Académie Suisse (French pronunciation: [akademi sɥis]) was a very popular, renowned, informal art school founded by Martin François Suisse (1781–1859) in 1815, and was located at the corner of the Quai des Orfévres (No. 4) and the Boulevard du Palais, in Paris, France. From Delacroix to Cézanne, most major French artists frequented this venue to meet colleagues and to study after male and female models.

== History ==
=== Early years ===
Martin François Suisse started his career as a baker or baker's apprentice, but then took up a career as artist's model. As D’Ivol notes, he posed for the celebrated artist Pierre-Narcisse Guérin (1774–1833) in 1796. Suisse was also, according to Monneret, a former model for the great, classicist, artist Jacques-Louis David (1748–1825). He, ‘Le Suisse’, posed some 39 times for the great man in the years 1811–1815.

Suisse's life as a model was interrupted by the Napoleonic Wars (1803–1815). In the latter years of the hostilities, he became a sailor, probably a conscripted marine. He was captured and imprisoned on a miserable prison hulk, most likely moored at Plymouth and was later moved to the infamous Dartmoor Prison, close by. Upon his release and repatriation, he returned to Paris where he resumed being a model. It was said that most of the figures in Eugène Delacroix's (1798–1863) ‘The Barque of Dante’, also called ‘Dante and Virgil in Hell’ by some, were painted from Suisse, in which case he was still modelling up to 1822 when the painting was completed. In the meantime, the year 1815 saw him open the art academy that was to make his name.

=== Suisse's Academy ===
The academy was located in a squalid, red house, 4 Quai des Orfévres, where a sombre corridor led to very old, well-worn and dirty stairs that took one up to the front door on the second floor. Here, Suisse fitted out a rented apartment, where a large room served as an art studio and the remaining two rooms became his personal living quarters.

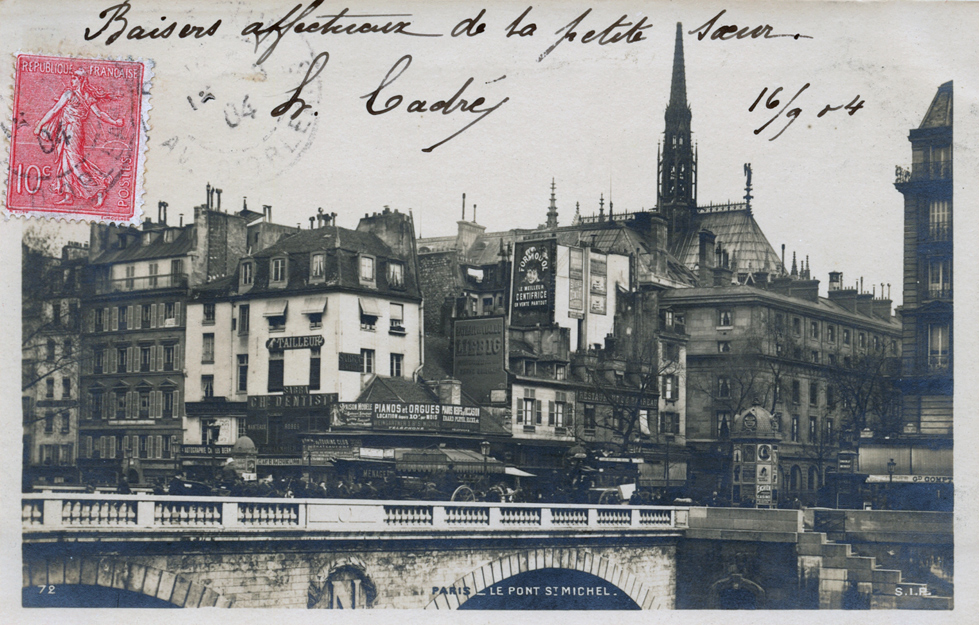
Pont St. Michel with 4, Quai des Orfèvres, the white, corner building, that housed Acadèmie Suisse in the background. Postcard, 1904.

The studio was not attractive in appearance, but was fairly well-lit by a quinquet with twenty lamps; an amphitheater of eighty stools or benches was more-or-less occupied according to the season, but one never saw very many empty seats. The increasingly nicotine-stained walls were covered with academies left in payment of a month in arrears by impoverished art students.

The Académie Suisse was much smaller and more informal than the École des Beaux Arts, where many students went on to continue their studies. The registration or attendance fee was modest; in 1850 students paid 5 US dollars/month (25 francs). Any artist could attend the academy to paint, draw or sculpt in their chosen media. Suisse provided a male model for three weeks of the month and a female for the remaining week. Paying fees meant that the cost of models could be shared collectively, which was a great aid to students who had little money. Some students would visit the morgue, just a few yards away from the Suisse's door on the Quai, towards the Pont Saint-Michel. Here, they could observe the anatomy of fresh corpses at no cost whatsoever.

Besides the support and advice of their fellow artists, there was no tuition as such at the Académie Suisse. However, Suisse was a drawing-master and could also offer advice when posing the model. He was a jovial, knowledgeable and helpful man, much loved and admired by his "students". He enjoyed regaling them with anecdotes of the artists he had sat for and the paintings he had seen created, and would often entertain them by reciting classical literature. In artistic circles, he was affectionately known as "Le Père Suisse". Influential individuals such as museum curators and art professors would frequently pay visits, such was the acclaim of the academy and the respect for its proprietor.

Suisse's access to young, talented artists also gave him an excellent position from which to become an art dealer. He would buy their works cheaply and sell them on at a considerably elevated price. There were numerous artists, but Nicolas François Octave Tassaert (1800–1874) was one of those whose works contributed the most to Suisse's fortune.

In 1858, Suisse retired and left his academy to his nephew Charles Alexandre Suisse (1813-1871), while remaining an honorary professor. However, it was the artist Etiènne Prosper Crébassol (1806–1883) that soon took on the ownership, certainly the running, of the academy, renaming it l’Academie Suisse-Crébassol.

At the age of 78, Suisse was found dead in his bed by a naked model, Sara, and some student artists. He was duly buried at the Cimetière de Montparnasse, Paris, on 29 November 1859. He had known and befriended many artists, and many would have attended his funeral. However, before he died, he asked that only his family attend, as artists' time was precious and he had no desire to disturb them. This instruction and his modest savings, he left to a niece who had been very close and helpful.

Passe writes that in 1876, the Ateliers de Dessin et de Peinture, were more-or-less limited to Julian's Academy in the Passage des Panoramas (see Crombie) and Crébassol's insufficient, little course in rue Gît-le-Cœur. He makes no mention of the renowned Académie Colarossi (see below), which must mean it had not been opened. It would seem that Crébassol had moved the school to No. 12, rue Gît-le-Cœur, 6th Arrondissement, over the river from the Quai des Orfèvres. Passe further states that two years later in 1879 the aged Crébassol sold his studio to the Italian model and sculptor Filippo Colarossi (1841–1906) for the sum of 500 fr. Crébassol was by this time 73 years old and was presumably no longer able and/or willing to maintain his academy any longer. He died at home in 1883.

Colarossi wanted to start his own professional art academy and had, through hard work and economy, saved the required funds.

In 1880, Colarossi moved his acquisition to a newly built, six studio complex in the courtyard of No. 10, Rue de la Grande Chaumière (6th arrondissement) in Montparnasse, then a hive of artistic activity. He renamed it the Académie Colarossi, a very successful, fee-funded school that offered expert tuition to male and female students from all over the world.

While Colarossi and his academy went from strength to strength, Suisse's considerable contributions to art were slowly forgotten. No monument or plaque was placed to remind Paris and its visitor of this remarkable man. The memory of his existence was further dimmed when in 1905, the block of buildings including 4 Quai des Orfèvres was expropriated and demolished to make way for the extension of the Palais de Justice in 1906.

Despite this, the memory and gratitude of artists persisted. An attempt was made by ex-students to rekindle a flame of remembrance. In a meeting at the Académie Colarossi in 1913, the "Société Internationale des Anciens Élèves des Académies Suisse-Crebassol-Colarossi" was formed. Its president was the renowned sculptor Jean Antoine Injalbert (1845–1933) and its aim was to hold exhibitions by former students, both in France and abroad. The society proposed to celebrate the contributions of the three schools to the world of art and promote the works of their students.

Sadly, the initiative seems to have failed, perhaps due to the advent of the First World War.

== Notable students ==
- David d'Angers (1788–1856)
- Jean Béraud (1849–1935)
- Richard Parkes Bonington (1802–1828)
- Eugène-Ferdinand Buttura (1812–1852)
- Alexandre Cabanel (1823–1889)
- Lyell Edwin Carr (1854–1912)
- Eugène Carrière (1849–1906)
- Paul Cézanne (1839–1906)
- Camille Claudel (1864–1943)
- Jean-Baptiste-Camille Corot (1796–1875)
- Gustave Courbet (1819–1877)
- Thomas Couture (1815–1879)
- Honoré Daumier (1808–1879)
- Eugène Delacroix (1798–1863)
- Michel Martin Drolling (1786–1851)
- Charles Auguste Émile Duran (Carolus-Duran) (1837–1917)
- Achille Emperaire (1829–1898)
- François-Louis Français (1814–1897)
- Jean-Louis André Théodore Géricault (1791–1824)
- Jean François Gigoux (1806–1894)
- Armand Guillaumin (1841–1927)
- Alfred Guillou (1844–1926)
- Jean-Jacques Henner (1829–1905)
- Jean-Auguste-Dominique Ingres (1780–1867)
- Eugène Isabey (1803–1886)
- Henry Lerolle (1848–1929)
- Maximilien Luce (1858–1941)
- Édouard Manet (1832–1883)
- Charles Marville (1813–1879)
- Ernest Meissonier (1815–1891)
- Claude Monet (1840–1926)
- Francisco Oller (1833–1917)
- Amable Louis Claude Pagnest (1790–1819)
- Camille Pissarro (1830–1903)
- Denis Auguste Marie Raffet (1804–1860)
- Emile Schuffenecker (1851–1934)
- Philippe Solari (1840–1906)
- Louis Charles Auguste Steinheil (1814–1885)

== Notes ==
1. Some sources give Suisse's forename as Charles. However, it appears he was in fact named Martin François.
2. 5 US dollars had the same buying power as 168 current US dollars.
