= François Vidal =

French poet and felibre (1832–1911)

- Born: 14 July 1832; Aix-en-Provence, Bouches-du-Rhône, France
- Died: 25 May 1911 (aged 78); Aix-en-Provence, Bouches-du-Rhône, France
- Resting place: Saint-Pierre Cemetery
- Other name: Francés Vidal
- Occupations: Librarian, poet

François Vidal (14 July 1832 – 25 May 1911) was a French Provençal poet and activist.

== Early life ==
François Vidal was born on 14 July 1832.

== Career ==
François Vidal was one of the first Provençal activists to join the Félibrige. He had a deep knowledge of the Occitan language, and was the editor (typesetting and revision) of Frédéric Mistral's Tresor dóu Felibrige.

He was the curator of the Bibliothèque Méjanes, the public library in Aix-en-Provence.

Vidal wrote poetry in Provençal. He revived the traditional use of the Provençal instrument known as "tambourin." In 1876, he became a "Majoral" (council member) of the Félibrige, a cultural and literary movement for the promotion of Provençal heritage.

== Death ==
Vidal died on 25 May 1911. He was buried at the Saint-Pierre Cemetery.
