= Joseph Villevieille =

French painter (1829–1916)

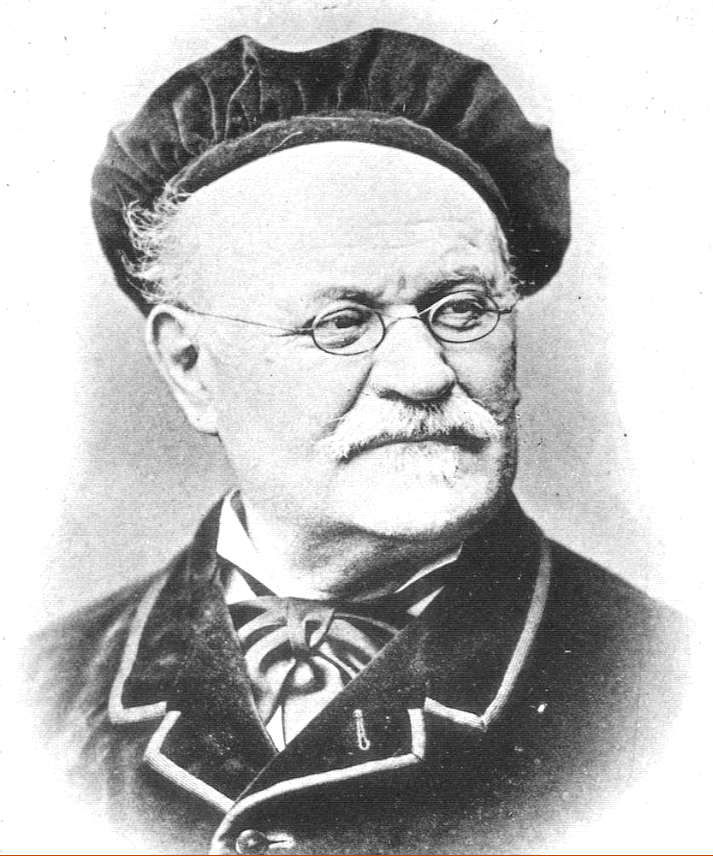
- Villevieille in 1901
- Born: 6 August 1829; Aix-en-Provence, Provence-Alpes-Côte d'Azur, France
- Died: 11 February 1916 (aged 86); Aix-en-Provence, Provence-Alpes-Côte d'Azur, France
- Resting place: Saint-Pierre Cemetery
- Education: École des Beaux-Arts
- Occupation: Painter

Joseph Villevieille (6 August 1829 – 11 February 1916) was a French painter.

== Early life ==
Joseph Villevieille was born on 6 August 1829 in Aix-en-Provence. He graduated from the École des Beaux-Arts in Paris.

== Career ==
Villevieille taught painting in Aix-en-Provence. He became friends with Paul Cézanne, whose mother he painted shortly before she died.

When the townhall of Aix-en-Provence was burgled on 22 August 1872, Villevieille was commissioned to do many paintings for its walls. Some of those paintings were portraits of prominent local painters like Jean-Baptiste van Loo and François Marius Granet, and local historian Scholastique Pitton. In 1900, he did a painting of Sextius Calvinus, the founder of Aix-en-Provence, which is also in the collection of the townhall.

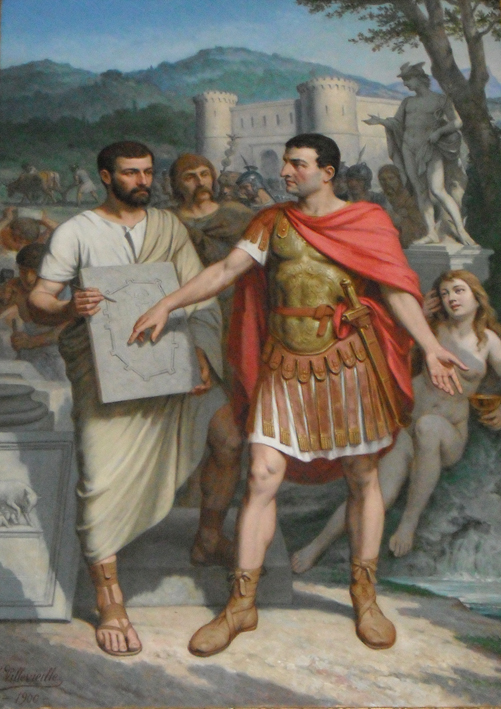
Sextius Calvinus, founder of Aix-en-Provence, painted by Joseph Villevieille in 1900.

== Death and legacy ==
Villevieille died on 11 February 1916 in Aix-en-Provence. He was buried at the Saint-Pierre Cemetery in Aix-en-Provence. The Avenue joseph villevieille in Aix-en-Provence was named in his honor.
