= Victor Leydet =

French businessman, politician and novelist (1845–1908)

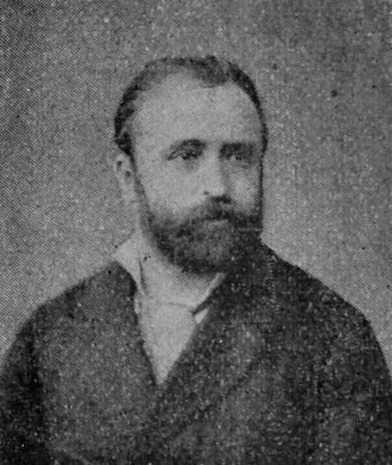
- Leydet in 1894
- Born: 3 July 1845; Aix-en-Provence, France
- Died: 22 October 1908 (aged 63); Paris, France
- Resting place: Saint-Pierre Cemetery, Aix-en-Provence
- Occupations: Businessman; Politician; Novelist
- Children: Edmond Leydet; Fernand Leydet; Louis Leydet; Lucien Marc Leydet; Paul Gabriel Leydet; Francia Leydet; Sextia Leydet
- Parent(s): Joseph Vincent Leydet; Marie Françoise Laurin

Victor Leydet (1845–1908) was a French businessman, politician and novelist. He served as a member of the Senate of France from 1897 to 1908.

== Biography ==
=== Early life ===
Victor Leydet was born on 9 July 1845 in Aix-en-Provence. His father, Joseph Vincent Leydet, was a factory worker. His mother was Marie Françoise Laurin. He was educated at the Collège Mignet (then known as the Collège Bourbon) in Aix.

=== Business career ===
He started his career as a shop assistant in shops in Aix. Later, he became Director of one of the biggest olive oil factories in Provence.

=== Political career ===
A staunch supporter of the Republic, he joined the Radical Left, a left-wing political party. He was elected to the town council of Aix in 1870. He also served as Deputy-Mayor of Aix from 1876 to 1882, when Salomon Bédarrides (1809-1886) was the Mayor. He also joined the General Council of the Bouches-du-Rhône (representing Peyrolles), when he campaigned for match-making factories to be returned to the French homeland rather than in her colonies; they were returned to France in 1872, and a new match-making factory was built in Aix from 1892 to 1895 (now reconverted as the Bibliothèque Méjanes, a public library, since 1989). He also worked as a judge in the Chamber of Commerce.

He served as a French Senator from 1897 to his death in 1908. He was opposed to the policies of Léon Gambetta (1838-1882) and Jules Ferry (1832-1892), and he voted against extending the Tonkin Campaign in Vietnam. Additionally, he voted in favour of the separation of church and state. He proposed a law to establish an income tax which would be progressive and proportional. He supported a break-up of the match-making industry in France, a French state monopoly which lasted from 1872 to 1992 (initially established to finance the Franco-Prussian War of 1870-1871). In his second tenure, which started in 1903, he opposed the policies of Maurice Rouvier (1842–1911) Pierre Tirard (1827-1893) He was also in favour of going after General Georges Ernest Boulanger (1837–1891), who attempted a coup d'état in 1889. He took a look at regulating the use of the Durance, protecting wild birds, increasing the number of fields of olive trees and tobacco in Provence, and promoting the Étang de Berre. Moreover, he was in favour of encouraging army recruitment, increasing railway tracks in France, and maintaining the University of Aix in Aix.

=== Novelist ===
He wrote three novels set in Aix, published weekly in the newspaper Le National.

=== Personal life ===
He married Louise Ely. They had five sons and two daughters:

- Edmond Leydet (1869-unknown). He was a Prefect of Eure-et-Loir.
- Fernand Leydet (1871-unknown).
- Louis Leydet (1873-unknown). He was a painter.
- Lucien Marc Leydet (1874-unknown).
- Paul Gabriel Leydet (1876-unknown).
- Francia Leydet (1877-unknown).
- Sextia Leydet (1883-unknown).

His son Louis was friends with painter Paul Cézanne (1839-1906). As a result, Victor Leydet attended Cézanne's funeral and said a few words about him.

He died on 22 October 1908 in Paris. His corpse was returned to Aix, and he was buried in the Saint-Pierre Cemetery in Aix.

=== Legacy ===
- The Rue Victor Leydet in Aix-en-Provence is named in his honour. He resided at number 40 on this street, formerly known as the Rue Villeverte. On 23 February 1911 the town council decided to rename the street after him.
- On 18 December 1910 a bronze bust designed by sculptor Auguste Carli (1868-1930) was dedicated on the Place Jeanne d'Arc in Aix. Several ministers were present alongside a crowd of about 700. However, the bust was stolen by the Germans in 1943, during World War II. A new bust, made of plaster and initially on his cemetery tomb, is now in its place, behind a newsagent.
