= Jean-Gilbert Ymbert =

French playwright (1786–1846)

- Born: 6 January 1786; Paris, France
- Died: 9 August 1846 (aged 60); Auteuil, Yvelines, France
- Occupation: Playwright

Jean-Gilbert Ymbert (6 January 1786 – 9 August 1846) was a French playwright of the first half of the 19th century.

Master of request at the conseil d'État and conseiller général for the Aisne department, he wrote satirical pieces and vaudevilles. His plays were presented on the most significant Parisian stages of his time including the Théâtre des Variétés, the Théâtre du Gymnase-Dramatique, and the Théâtre de la Porte-Saint-Martin.

His son Théodore Ymbert followed him into legal administration and for a while was also a composer.

== Works ==
- 1816: Des Dénonciateurs et des dénonciations, with Antoine-François Varner
- 1816: L'Art d'obtenir des places, ou la Clef des ministères, ouvrage dédié aux gens sans emploi et aux solliciteurs de toutes les classes
- 1817: Le Mari sans le savoir, comédie vaudeville in 1 act, with Varner
- 1817: Le Solliciteur, ou l'Art d'obtenir des places, comedy in 1 act, mingled with vaudevilles, with Eugène Scribe
- 1818: Éloquence militaire, ou l'Art d'émouvoir le soldat, d'après les plus illustres exemples tirés des armées des différents peuples et principalement d'après les proclamations, harangues, discours et paroles mémorables des généraux et officiers français, par une Société de militaires et d'hommes de lettres
- 1818: L'Obligeant, ou la Fureur d'être utile, comedy in 1 act, mingled with vaudevilles, with Varner
- 1820: Le Dîner de garçons, comedy in 1 act, mingled with couplets, with Varner
- 1820: L'Homme automate, folie-parade mingled with couplets, with Varner
- 1820: Le Propriétaire sans propriété, comédie-vaudeville in 1 act, with Varner
- 1820: Trottin, ou le Retour du sérail, folie-vaudeville in 1 act, with Varner
- 1821: L'Art du ministre, par une ex-Excellence
- 1822: L'art de faire des dettes et de promener ses créanciers
- 1822: La Marchande de coco, ou Les projets de réforme, folie-grivoise in 1 act, mingled with couplets, with Varner
- 1823: Le Faubourien, ou le Philibert de la rue Mouffetard, comédie grivoise in 1 act, mingled with couplets, with Varner
- 1823: L'Intérieur d'un bureau, ou la Chanson, comédie-vaudeville in 1 act, with Scribe and Varner
- 1823: Le Précepteur dans l'embarras, comédie-vaudeville in 1 act, with Varner
- 1824: L'Art de promener ses créanciers, ou Complément de l'Art de faire des dettes, par un homme comme il faut [J.-G. Ymbert], dédié aux gens destitués, réformés, aux victimes des révolutions et des changements de ministères passés, présents et à venir
- 1825: Mœurs administratives, 2 vols.
- 1825: Bureaucratie
- 1825: Le Sous-chef, ou la Famille Gautier, comédie-vaudeville in 1 act
- 1825: La Ville neutre, ou le Bourgmestre de Neustadt, comédie-vaudeville in 1 act, with Varner
- 1825: Le Provincial sans emploi, ou les Bureaux de placements, avis aux solliciteurs de toutes les classes et de tous les pays qui se servent du ministère des agents d'affaires
- 1828: La Nourrice sur lieu, scènes de famille, mingled with couplets, with Armand-François Jouslin de La Salle, Louis Gabriel Montigny and Théodore Nézel
- 1833: Allocution prononcée par M. Ymbert pour l'inauguration de la statue de Jean Racine à La Ferté-Milon, 29 September 1833
- 1834: Nouvelle manifestation de l'opinion publique, ou Premiers résultats des réélections dans la garde nationale de Paris
- 1836: Question d'administration financière... Une main pour recevoir le milliard et une autre main pour le payer, ou faut-il supprimer les payeurs-contrôleurs de département ?
- 1838: L'An VIII et l'an 1838 ou Causeries familières à la portée de tous les contribuables sur cette question : les conseils généraux de département et d'arrondissement doivent-ils avoir plus de libertés qu'il y a trente-sept ans ? avec examen détaillé du projet de loi présenté à la Chambre des députés sur les attributions des conseils généraux et d'arrondissement

== Bibliography ==
- Ernest Desplaces, Louis Gabriel Michaud, Biographie universelle, ancienne et moderne, 1843, p. 262
- Ludovic Lalanne, Dictionnaire historique de la France, 1872, p. 1822
- Le Conseil d'État, son histoire à travers les documents d'époque, 1799-1974 : catalogue de l'exposition organisée au Palais-Royal 22-28 janvier 1975, à l'occasion de la présentation de l'ouvrage, 1975, p. 1000
