= Hôtel Louvre et Paix =

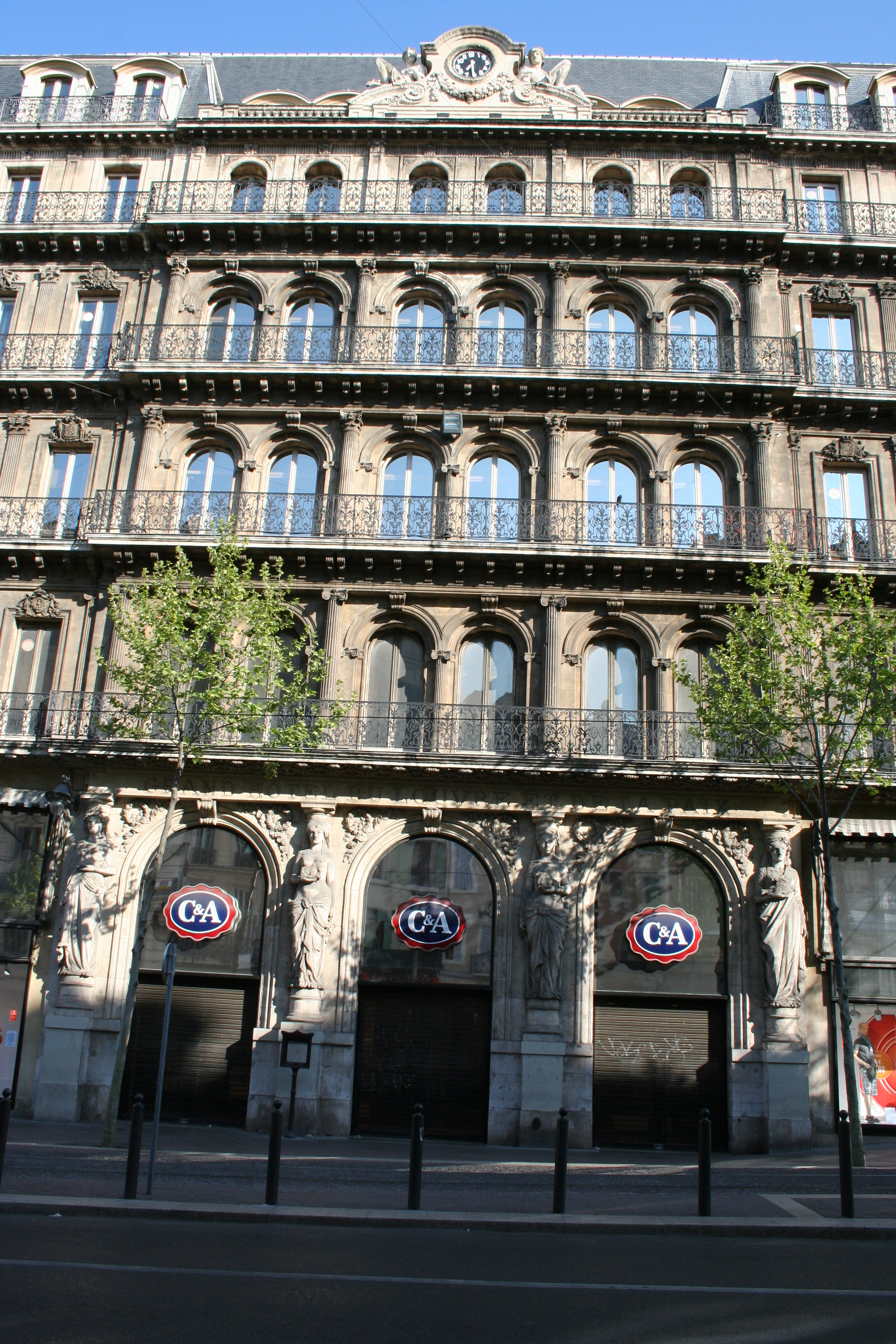
- Interactive map of the Hôtel Louvre et Paix area

General information
- Location: 49-53, Canebière, Marseille, France
- Coordinates: 43.2969°N 5.3785°E
- Completed: 1863

Design and construction
- Architect: Jean-Charles Pot

The Hôtel Louvre et Paix (a.k.a. Hôtel de la Marine) is a historic building in Marseille, France. Dedicated in 1863 as a luxury hotel, it was used by the Kriegsmarine during World War II. It now houses city administration offices and a C&A store.

== Location ==
It is located at numbers 49–53 on the Canebière near the Old Port, in the 1st arrondissement of Marseille.

== History ==
The hotel was built in the 1860s, at a time when the Canebière was a meeting place for high society. It was designed by architect Jean-Charles Pot. Sculptor Hippolyte Ferrat designed four caryatids on the front wall (a sphinx for America, an elephant for Asia, a dromedary for Africa, a fish for Europe) as well as two sculptures on the pediment surrounding the clock. The hotel was dedicated in 1863.

During World War II, the hotel played a significant role. It was a used by the French Navy from March 11, 1941, onwards. Later, it was used by the Kriegsmarine, the navy of Nazi Germany.

It now houses city administration offices and a C&A store.

== Architectural significance ==
It has been listed as an official monument since 1982.
