= Philippe Solari =

French sculptor

Philippe Solari (2 May 1840 in Aix-en-Provence – 20 January 1906 in Aix-en-Provence) was a provencal sculptor, of Italian descent, a contemporary and friend of Paul Cézanne and Émile Zola. He acquired French nationality in 1870.

== Youth ==
Born into a relatively poor family with six sisters, Philippe Solari was educated at the boarding school of Notre-Dame, where he got to know Émile Zola. The two became very close friends. Later, between 1860 and 1865, Solari would attend the regular Thursday soirées at Zola's home in Paris for discussions on art; other participants included the painters Paul Cézanne, another of Zola's boyhood friends, and Camille Pissarro.

Drawn towards art, and sculpture in particular, Solari went on to attend the School of Fine Arts (Ecole des Beaux-Arts) in Aix.

== Career ==
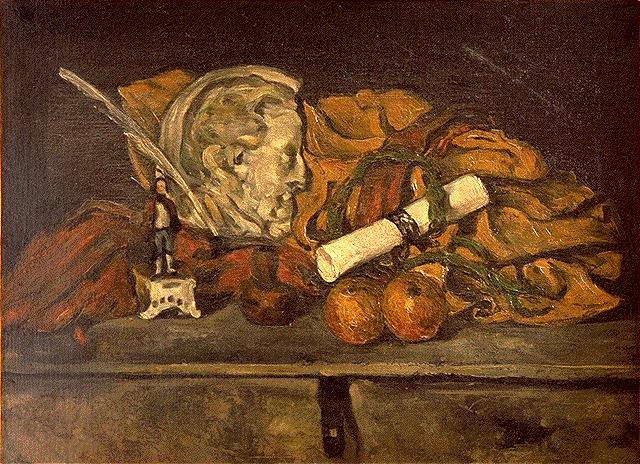
Still life with medallion by Philippe Solari, Paul Cézanne 1873

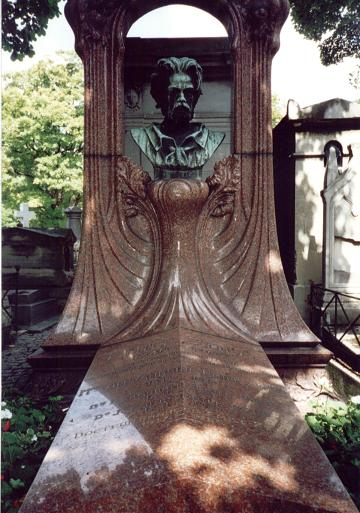
Bust of Émile Zola, Philippe Solari

After winning the Prix Granet in Aix, he attended the Academy of Charles Suisse in Paris. This artist's studio, situated on the quai des Orfèvres on the Île de la Cité, also counted Édouard Manet, Claude Monet, Camille Pissarro and Paul Cézanne among its students. Solari, however, found it hard to make ends meet as an artist. The painter Achille Emperaire, trained at the same academy, commented, "Everybody had support, only poor Solari was forced to worry about his next crust." He made his debut in Paris at the Salon of 1867.

At the Salon of 1868, speaking about Solari's "Sleeping negro", Zola declared, "I find in Philippe Solari one of our two or three really modern sculptors. He has ceased to dream about absolute beauty. Beauty for him has become the living expression of nature, the interpretation of the human body."

When his sculpture of Johan Barthold Jongkind was unveiled in the Cemetery of Montmartre in 1904, Solari preferred not to step forward to be acknowledged. This characteristic reserve was doubtless responsible for the many closed doors that he encountered in the course of his career. A first cast of the sculpture of Jongkind is on display in rue Ganay in Aix.

At the end of his life he produced two sculptures of Cézanne, one from memory (known as Cézanne, the dreamer), the other sculpted from life in Cézanne's studio in Aix. The journalist Jules Bernex told an anecdote about the last sitting. When adding the final touches, the sculptor took a pince-nez out of his pocket and placed it on his nose. Cézanne apparently objected, exclaiming that never again would he sit for someone who could not see him with the naked eye.

== Family ==
He married Thérèse Strempel, the daughter of a German industrialist, in 1867. Although she was to die not long afterwards, she nevertheless bore him two children: a daughter in 1867 and six years later a son, Émile, whose godparents would be Émile Zola and his wife. Solari had in turn been a witness at the Zola's marriage.

== Death ==
While working on one of the floats for the carnival of Aix, Solari developed pneumonia. As he was being taken by carriage to hospital, he murmured, "What a pity about the weather."

Solari died in the same year as Cézanne. The painter Joseph Ravaisou commented, "The year that is ending has seen two artists pass away who, despite having very different fortunes in life, were both singled out by a detachment from worldly matters and the same propensity for pure naive emotion. One was a sculptor, the other a painter. [...] Prosperity for Cézanne and Poverty for Solari brought comparable joys, side by side throughout the lives of the two artists, hand in hand even with the approach of death: both artists were struck down in the same circumstances by the same illness."
