= Les Animaux modèles =

Ballet

- Serge Lifar and Yvette Chauviré in the original 1942 production
- Choreographer: Serge Lifar
- Music: Francis Poulenc
- Based on: Fables of Jean de La Fontaine
- Premiere: 8 August 1942; Paris Opera, Paris

Les Animaux modèles, FP 111, is a ballet dating from 1940 to 1942 with music by Francis Poulenc. It was the third and final ballet that he composed and was staged at the Paris Opéra in 1942, with choreography by Serge Lifar, who also danced in the 1942 premiere. The themes of the ballet are drawn from the Fables of Jean de La Fontaine.

== History ==
The sections of the ballet are based on stories from Jean de La Fontaine's Fables. These tales had inspired works by French composers from Lully to Gounod, Offenbach and Saint-Saëns. Its title was provided by the poet Paul Eluard, as he had done for several other works by Poulenc at his request.

Poulenc began work on his ballet in 1940, completing a piano score in September 1941 and orchestrating it between October 1941 and June 1942. He wrote his own scenario for the ballet, making the various animals more human-like than usual. In his words, "The grasshopper has become an ageing ballerina, the ant an old provincial housemaid, the amorous lion a pimp, Death an elegant woman – a kind of duchess with a mask". The commentator Gérald Hugon observes:

[D]ifferent musical styles are brought together in delightful fashion – passionate "grand piano" writing set against the "bad boy's" waltz-java in Le Lion amoureux, the verve of the Offenbachian can-can in L'Homme entre deux âges et ses deux maîtresses, Mussorgskyan turns of phrase in La Mort et le Bûcheron and a deliberate borrowing from Paganini's Caprice No. 24 in Les Deux Coqs.

Hugon comments that all these influences are absorbed by Poulenc and turned into his own style. At the time of the premiere, Poulenc's friend and colleague Arthur Honegger wrote that "the influences that have worked upon him – Chabrier, Satie, Stravinsky – are now completely assimilated. Listening to his music you think – it's Poulenc."

The company for the premiere was headed by Serge Lifar (who also choreographed the work) and Yvette Chauviré. Paris was under Nazi occupation, and the many German officers in the audience failed to spot the composer's defiant incorporation of the anti-German song "Vous n'aurez pas l'Alsace et la Lorraine" in his score. Poulenc later reduced the full score to a shorter orchestral suite.

Poulenc dedicated the ballet to the memory of his childhood friend Raymonde Linossier (1897–1930). A 1944 edition cites the dedication to Poulenc's long-time friend and copyist Yevgeny Gunst.

== Structure ==
Ballet

The action is set in rural Burgundy, during the 18th century.

1. Petit jour (Dawn): très calme
2. L'ours et les deux compagnons (The Bear and the Travelers): très animé
3. La cigale et la fourmi (The Ant and the Grasshopper): très allant
4. Le lion amoureux (The Lion in Love): passionnément animé
5. L'homme entre deux âges et ses deux maîtresses (The Man with two Mistresses): prestissimo
6. La mort et le bûcheron (Death and the woodcutter): très lent
7. Le combat des deux coqs (The battle of the two roosters): très modéré
8. Le repas de midi (Lunchtime).

Orchestral suite

1. Petit jour: très calme
2. Le lion amoureux: passionnément animé.
3. L'homme entre deux âges et ses deux maîtresses: prestissimo
4. La mort et le bûcheron: très lent
5. Le combat des deux coqs: très modéré
6. Le repas de midi

== Sources ==
- Poulenc, Francis (2014). Southon, Nicolas (ed.). Articles and Interviews – Notes from the Heart. Translated by Nichols, Roger. Burlington, US: Ashgate. ISBN 978-1-4094-6622-2.
- Schmidt, Carl B (2001). Entrancing Muse: A Documented Biography of Francis Poulenc. Hillsdale, NY: Pendragon Press. ISBN 978-1-57647-026-8.
