= The Bear and the Travelers =

Aesop's fable

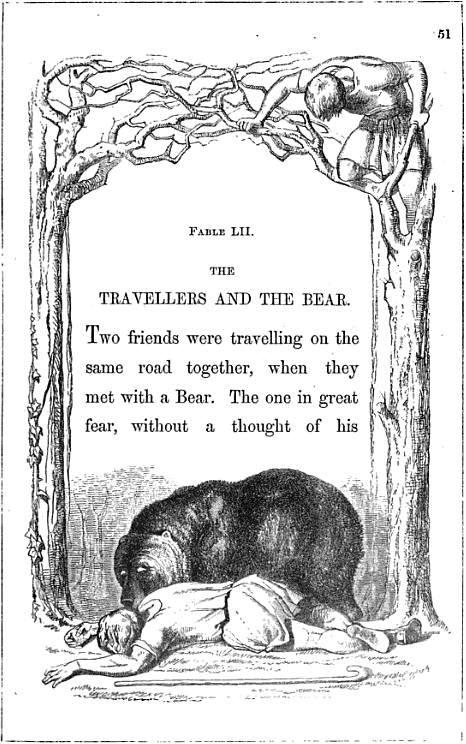
John Tenniel's page design for the fable from the 1848 edition of Aesop

The Bear and the Travelers is a fable attributed to Aesop and is number 65 in the Perry Index. It was expanded and given a new meaning in mediaeval times.

== The Classical Fable ==
First recorded in Latin verse by Avianus, the tale is one that educators recommend for teaching young children about moral values. The basic story is of two friends walking through rough country who are suddenly confronted by a bear. One of the travellers saves himself by scrambling up a tree while the other throws himself on the ground and pretends to be dead. The animal comes close and sniffs him over but then leaves, for bears are reputed not to touch dead meat. Then the man in the tree came down to his comrade and jokingly asked what the bear had been saying to him. "It was some good advice," said his friend; "he told me never to trust someone who deserts you in need."

Feigning illness or death is a core plot element in several of the fables. Author and San Francisco Examiner journalist Allen Kelly, writing in 1903, examines the idea of 'playing dead' to evade injury when confronted by a bear and gives his opinion that there is some truth in this fable.

== The origin of a European proverb ==
The late mediaeval chronicler Philippe de Commynes records that an embassy was sent by King Louis XI of France to the Emperor Frederick III in 1475 with a proposal to divide up the Burgundian territories. The Emperor replied with a story of how three friends obtain credit at an inn by promising to catch a bear and dispose of the skin but are eventually forced to flee; one of them falls to the ground, is sniffed by the bear but then left unharmed. Asked by his friends what the bear had to say, he replied "She charged me never for the future to sell the bear's skin till the beast was dead".

This is one of the earliest references to a proverb now found throughout Europe, 'Catch the bear before you sell his skin'. The heart of the story that the Emperor tells is Aesop's fable, but it has now been adapted to end with the lesson not to count one's chickens before they are hatched. A variation on the story appears in the Neo-Latin author Laurentius Abstemius' collection of a hundred fables (Hecatomythium) written some time in the 1490s. This was titled De Cortario emente pellem Ursi a Venatore nondum capti (How a tanner bought a bear's skin from hunters before it was taken). But it was La Fontaine's Fables that assured the continued popularity of this variation of the tale (V. 20.) His version, L'ours et les deux compagnons, is much the same as that of Philippe de Commynes apart from the detail that only two men are involved, one of whom escapes up a tree (as in Aesop). Aesop, however, had reserved the moral of not anticipating success in an enterprise before it is accomplished for his fable of The Milkmaid and Her Pail.

== Artistic interpretations ==
Because of the connection with La Fontaine, it is in France that one finds the fable most used. Louis Lacombe set it as part of his Opus 72 in 1875. It was made into a nine-minute silent film by the film producer Marius O'Gallop in 1920. The composer Francis Poulenc included it as the second episode in his ballet suite Les Animaux modèles (1941) and it was Plate 63 of the hundred fables illustrated by etchings heightened with watercolour by the artist Marc Chagall (1952).

Among those drawing from Aesop's version, the young Scottish artist Martin Hill produced a large oil painting of the scene in 2009. In 1965 the composer Edward Hughes included the fable in a poetic version by Peter Westmore among his ten Songs from Aesop's Fables. There is also a setting by Anthony Plog for narrator, horn and piano (2011).
