= Louise Germain =

French painter

- Born: 1874; Gap, Hautes-Alpes, France
- Died: 1939 (aged 64–65); Aix-en-Provence, France
- Known for: Painting
- Spouse: Eugene Germain

Louise Germain (née Louise Richier; 22 April 1874 – 13 October 1939) was a French painter.

== Biography ==
Richier was born in 1874, in Gap, Hautes-Alpes, but lived much of her childhood and adolescence in Algeria, returning to France by the time she was twenty. By 1894, she was studying in Marseille with Walter Bildecombe/Biddlecombe, a British-born animal painter.

She married Eugene Germain and lived in Aix-en-Provence, with him and their two children, Émile and Sylvain.

At the age of 25, in about 1899, she met Joseph Ravaisou and her style of painting changed under his influence. She and Ravaisou had a joint exhibition in 1914 at Galerie Audin. By this time, she had come to be regarded as a leading landscape painter in the south of France.

Reportedly, she also worked alongside Paul Cézanne, as did Ravaisou. In 1925, she was present with Ravaisou on his deathbed, and was devastated by his death. Although her artistic output was greatly reduced, she was a regular exhibitor with the Société des Femmes Artistes (FAM) from 1931 to 1936. Her works included "The Geese".

Germain died in her apartment in Aix-en-Provence in 1939, aged 65. She is buried in the Saint-Pierre Cemetery.

== Works ==
- "Nahansicht von vier Wildenten" (1905)
- "Les Canards à l'Abreuvoir" (1910)
- "Les Coqs dans la Basse-Cour" (1910)
- "Gathering Hay" (circa 1920)
- "Lac de haute montagne" (1927)
- "La Meige vue de la grave" (1929)
