= Théodore Ymbert =

French lawyer and composer

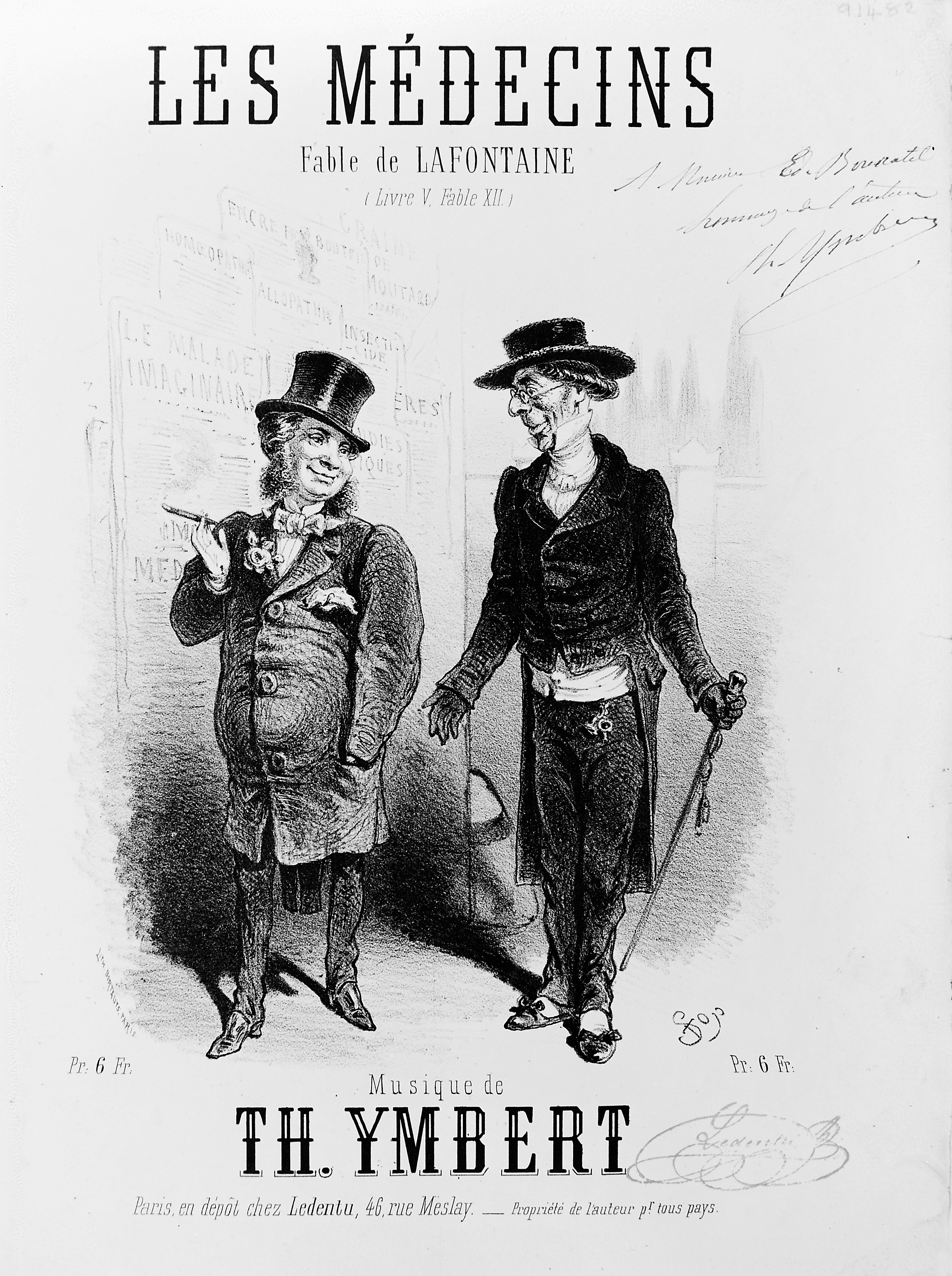
The cover of one of Ymbert’s fable settings

Henri Théodore Ymbert (10 July 1827 in Auteuil, Yvelines – 22 September 1894 at Bourbonne-les-Bains) was a French lawyer and composer.

== Life and career ==
Théodore Ymbert was the son of the dramatist Jean-Gilbert Ymbert, who also practised as a legal administrator. Following in the family profession of law, he also studied composition under Auguste Barbereau. His musical activity in Paris over the years 1858 – 69 consisted for the most part in settings for voice. Two works were his most successful: the music for the one-act comic opera Les Deux Cadis (1861); and his Sept Fables de la Fontaine, which was preferred to Jacques Offenbach’s settings of La Fontaine's Fables when it was first performed in 1862, and which continues to be performed.

Professionally Ymbert gained his doctorate in law and practised in the Court of Appeal of Paris. As well as writing on both legal and musical subjects, he also collaborated in the revision of a number of administrative reference works. Among the latter was the Dictionnaire des formules ou mairie pratique contenant les modèles de tous les actes d'administration municipal (1880) and the Dictionnaire général d'administration (1884), for which he was qualified after serving as mayor of Bourbonne-les-Bains between 1873-8 and then as a deputy judicial officer.
