= Antonio Buttura =

Italian–French translator and writer (1771–1832)

- Born: 1 January 1771; Malcesine, Republic of Venice (later the Italian Republic)
- Died: 23 August 1832 (aged 61); Paris, France
- Occupations: Translator, poet, linguist
- Known for: Italian–French dictionary, translations of Boileau

Antonio Buttura (1771 – 23 August 1832) also known in France as Antoine Buttura was an Italian-born translator, linguist, and writer who became a French citizen. He was known for his bilingual Italian French works and for introducing major French classical literature to an Italian readership.

== Biography ==
Antonio Buttura was born in the town of Malcesine on the eastern shore of Lake Garda, during the final years of the Republic of Venice. A priest by training he became involved in literary work and translation during a period of growing Franco-Italian cultural exchange in the early 19th century. After the fall of Venice he moved to France and naturalized as a French citizen where he continued publishing linguistic and literary texts until his death in Paris in 1832.

== Role during the Napoleonic period ==
Buttura supported the reforms and ideals of the Napoleonic era and served briefly in clerical-administrative posts within the restructured governments of Northern Italy. After moving to Paris, he was part of a circle of intellectuals translating works and fostering literary diplomacy between France and Italy.
