= Achille Empéraire =

French painter

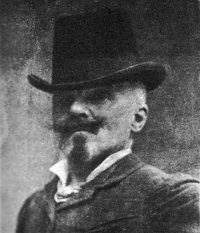
- Achille Emperaire circa 1895
- Born: 16 September 1829; Aix-en-Provence, Bouches-du-Rhône, France
- Died: 8 January 1898 (aged 68); Aix-en-Provence, Bouches-du-Rhône, France
- Occupation: Painter

Achille Empéraire (1829–1898) was a French painter.

== Biography ==
=== Early life ===
Achille Empéraire was born with dwarfism and a hunchback on 16 September 1829 in Aix-en-Provence. He took drawing lessons in Aix from 1844 to 1856.

From 1857 onwards, he would often go to Paris and started attending Thomas Couture's school there. Adamant to make the grade, he would ask for help anywhere, undaunted by the prospect of living in the streets. He even wrote in his letters, "When occasionally I can spend 80 centimes on a meal, it feels like an orgy... The rest of the time, to skip a meal, I quell my hunger by eating bread crumbs with wine and sugar."

=== Career ===
On the eve of his first exhibition in Paris, he applied varnish on his canvas. The next day, the painting was in pieces. Traumatised, he would never use varnish again, which explains why a lot of his paintings have vanished. It is only thanks to Joseph Ravaisou's son that some paintings are still there to be seen. By serendipity, he was commissioned a painting for the Louvre Museum and earned 1.000 francs for it, a hefty sum at the time. This money enabled him to pay for some debts and for his trip back to Aix in October 1873. It was only in 1873 that he met Joachim Gasquet in Aix, who would turn out to be Emperaire's best friend up until his death.

Although he went back to Paris in 1881 and again in 1882, when he was honoured with becoming a member of the Société libre des Artistes français, he would hardly leave Aix from 1873 onwards, living at 2, place des Prêcheurs. While in Aix, he liked to go painting in Le Tholonet. He was known for being headstrong. Joachim Gasquet once mentioned his "unwavering bravery and unquestioning pride", someone who, on his deathbed, still had faith in "the beauty, the art and the genius of the world".

Although he met Paul Cézanne, who became a close friend of his, at the Académie Suisse in Paris in 1861, he rejected his style. Indeed, for his nudes and landscapes, he preferred to use thick material. For John Rewald, Emperaire, "was able to loop out of Cézanne's influence, and his work denotes a surprising personality and a most peculiar strand". He had a passion for Titian and Édouard Manet. Cézanne once said, "Well, he didn't make it. Still, he was a lot more of a painter than all those dripping with medals and honours".

=== Personal life ===
He resided in an apartment at 16, rue Émeric-David in Aix.

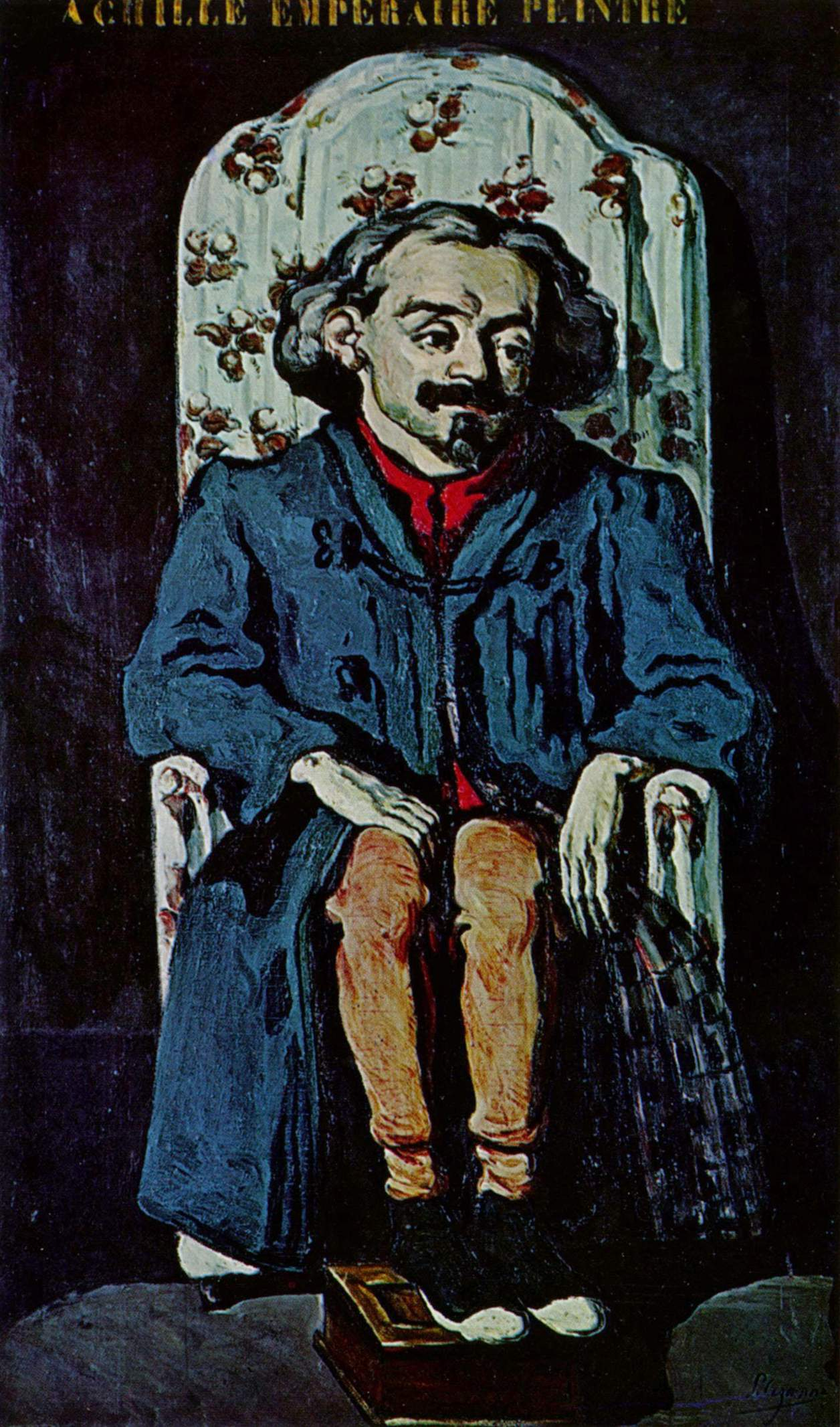
Portrait of Achille Emperaire, by Paul Cézanne. Musée d'Orsay, oil on canvas.

He died on 8 January 1898.

== Paintings ==
- Nu couché
- Baigneuse de Saul (au revers un autoportrait)
- Portrait de femme en buste (au revers un nu couché)
- Paysage de la campagne d'Aix
- Nature morte ou pichet (au revers deux amazones traversant un bois)
- Nature morte aux pêches ainsi que plusieurs dessins
