= Eugène-Ferdinand Buttura =

French painter

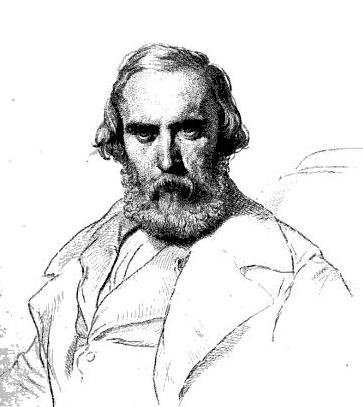
Portrait of Buttura by Paul Delaroche, 1863.

Eugène-Ferdinand Buttura (1812–1852) was a French historical landscapist.

== Life ==
The son of the poet Antonio Buttura, he was born in Paris in 1812. He began his studies in the atelier of Bertin, from which he went to that of Paul Delaroche. He won the Prix de Rome for landscape in 1837 with his picture of Apollo inventing the seven-stringed Lyre. On his return from Rome in 1842, he exhibited The Ravine, and in 1848, Daphne and Chloe at the Fountain of the Nymphs, for each of which he was rewarded with a gold medal. Other notable works included Nausicaa and Ulysses, Saint Jerome in the Desert, and 'A View of Tivoli. He also produced some small pictures, in the style of the realistic school, such as Campo Vicino (1845), which was lithographed by Anastasi; The Temple of Antoninus and Faustina (1846), a View of the Cascades of Tivoli, and a Park Interior, which rivalled photography in their neatness and sharpness of effect and minuteness of detail. He died in Paris in 1852.

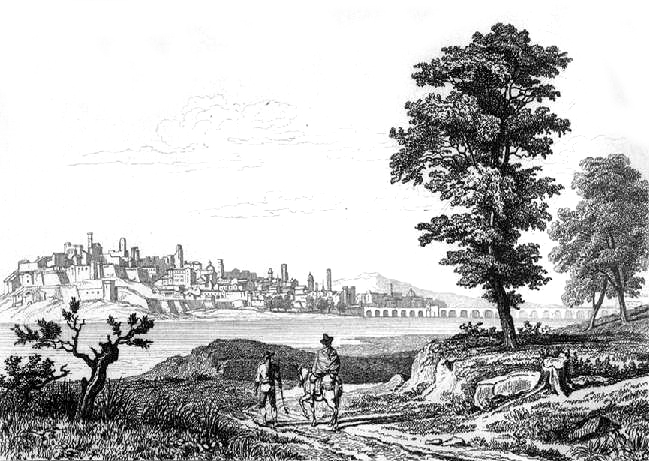
View of Badajoz from the San Cristobal heights.
