= Auteuil, Yvelines =

Auteuil
- Commune
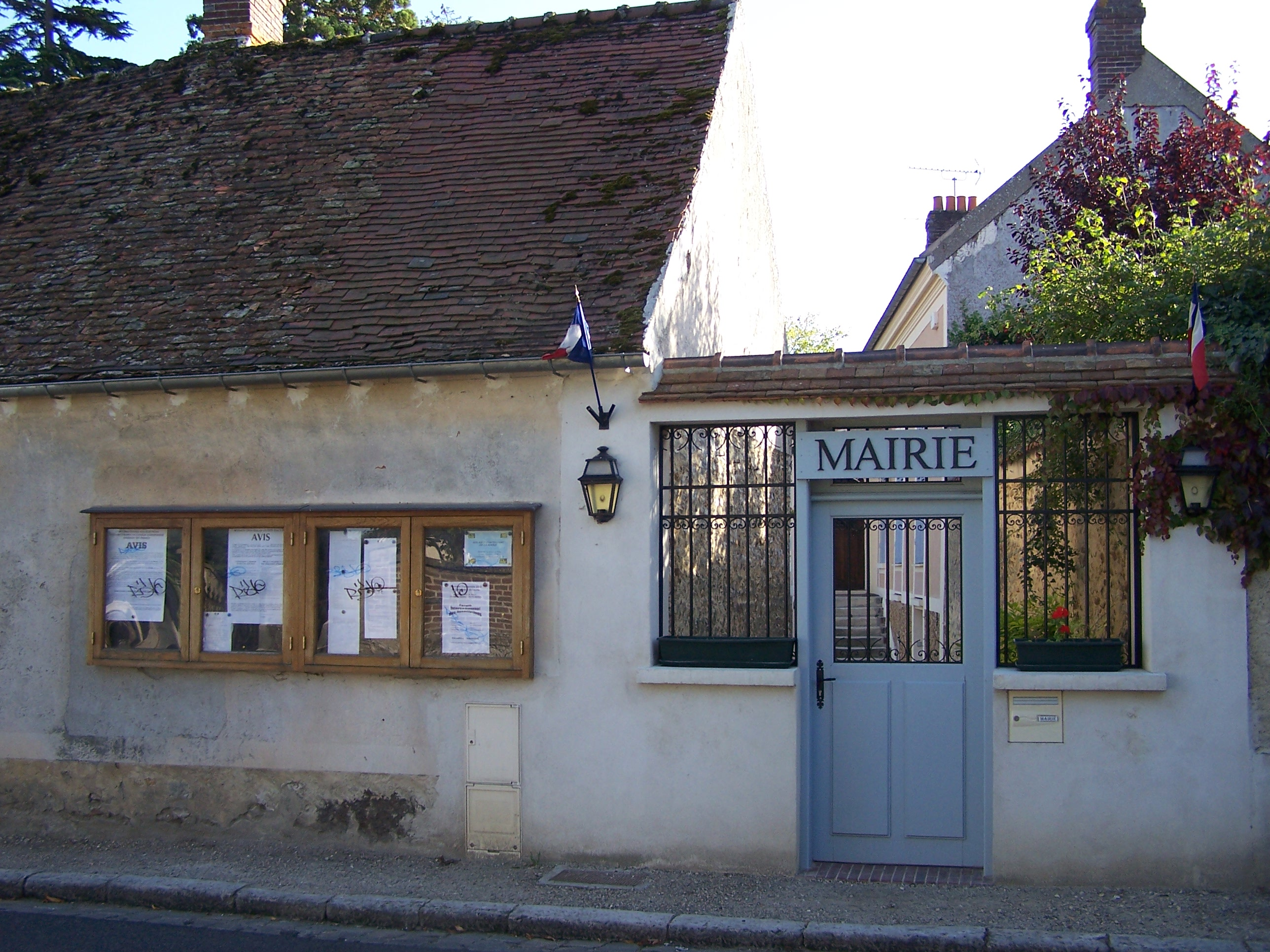
- The town hall in Auteuil

- Coat of arms
- Location of Auteuil
- Location within France Location within Île-de-France (region)
- Coordinates: 48°50′28″N 1°49′05″E
- Country: France
- Region: Île-de-France
- Department: Yvelines
- Arrondissement: Rambouillet
- Canton: Aubergenville
- Intercommunality: CC Cœur Yvelines

Government
  - Mayor (2020–2026): Marie-Christine Chavillon
- Area^{1}: 4.40 km^{2} (1.70 sq mi)
- Elevation: 130 m (430 ft)
- Highest elevation: 171 m (561 ft)
- Lowest elevation: 82 m (269 ft)
- Population (2023): 1,020
  - Density: 232/km^{2} (600/sq mi)
- Time zone: UTC+01:00 (CET)
  - Summer (DST): UTC+02:00 (CEST)
- INSEE/Postal code: 78034 /78770
- ^{1} French Land Register data, which excludes lakes, ponds, glaciers > 1 km^{2} (0.386 sq mi or 247 acres) and river estuaries.

Auteuil (French pronunciation: [otœj]) is a commune in the Yvelines department in north-central France.

== Population ==
Historical population
Year	Pop.	±% p.a.
1968	297	—
1975	422	+5.15%
1982	536	+3.48%
1990	692	+3.24%
1999	864	+2.50%
2007	913	+0.69%
2012	879	−0.76%
2017	955	+1.67%
2023	1,020	+1.10%
Source: INSEE

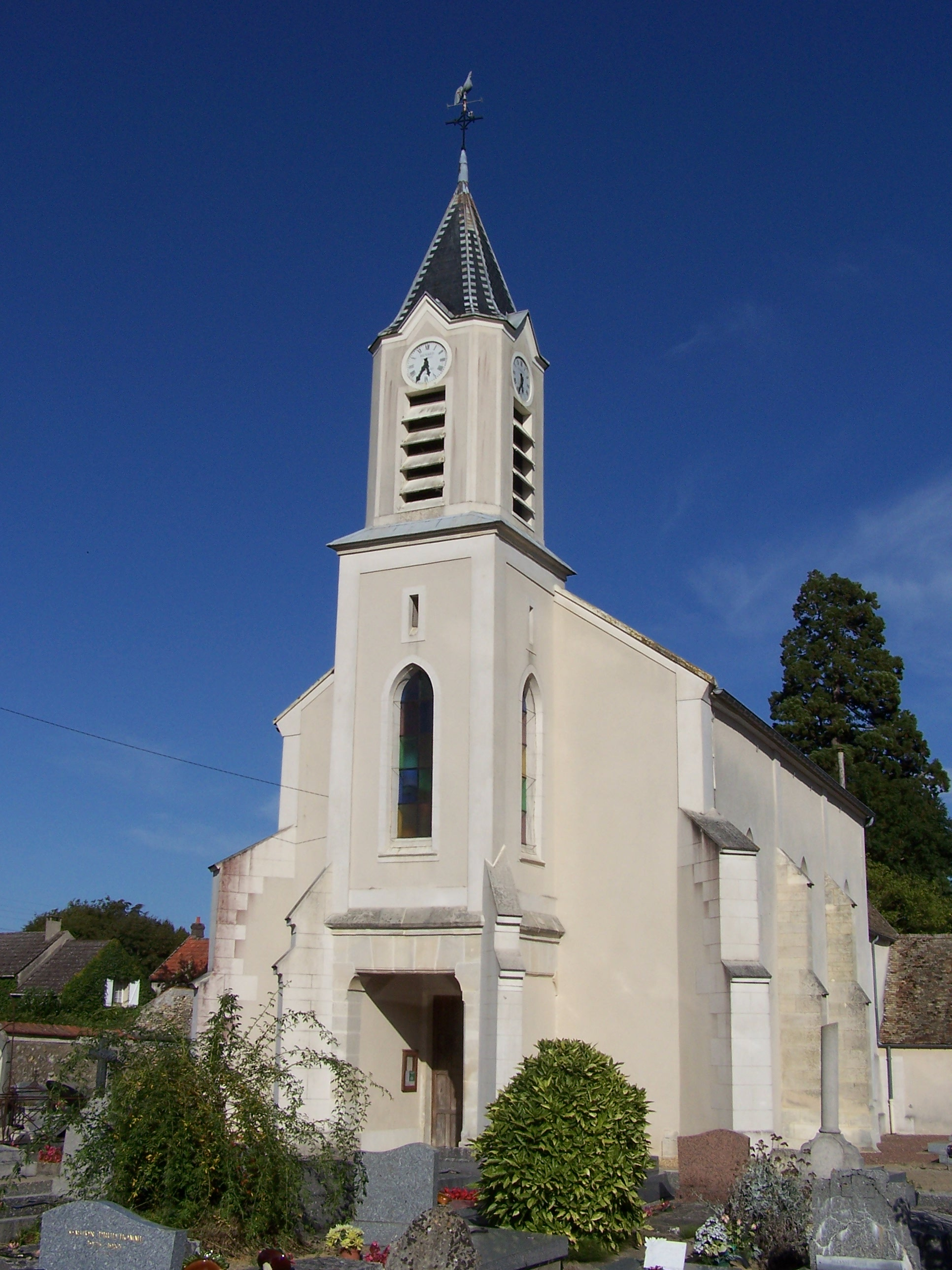
Sainte-Éparche

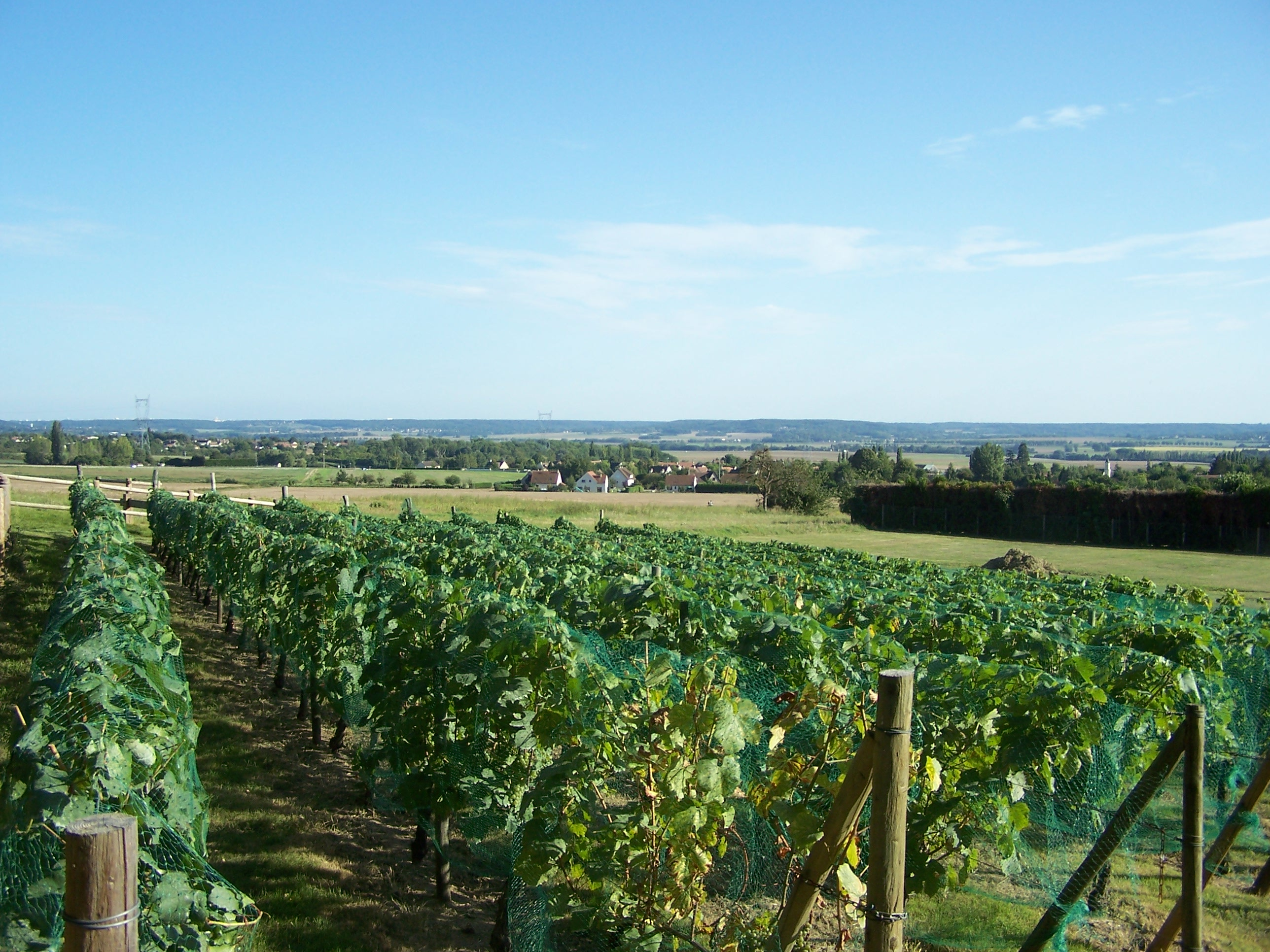
Viticulture

== See also ==
- Communes of the Yvelines department
