= Joseph Ravaisou =

French painter (1865–1925)

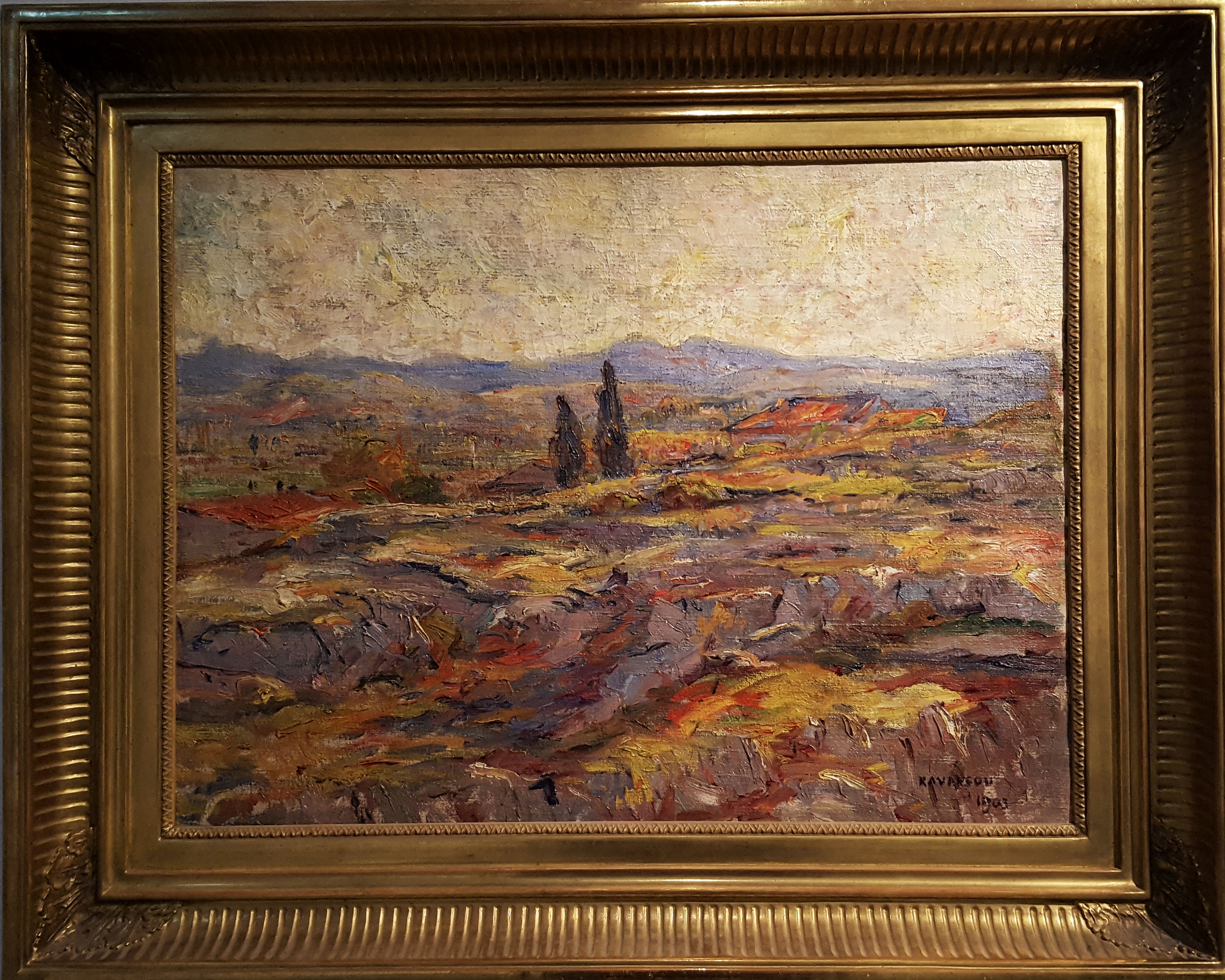
Le Plateau de Celony by Joseph Ravaisou, (1865 - 1903)

Joseph Ravaisou (11 November 1865 – 22 December 1925) was a French landscape painter.

Ravaisou was born on 11 November 1865, in Bandol, Var. In 1878, he moved to Aix-en-Provence to work as a school teacher, and subsequently became a music conductor and a music critic.

After seeing an exhibition in Paris with paintings by Camille Pissarro and Claude Monet, he returned to Aix and worked alongside Louise Germain. From 1899 to 1902, he also worked with Paul Cézanne, whom he admired. He died at Aix, on 22 December 1925, aged 70.

Some of his works are kept in the Musée Granet in Aix-en-Provence, as well as in Marseille, Martigues and Paris.
